= Cariñena =

Cariñena may refer to:

- Cariñena, Aragon, a village in the province of Zaragoza, in the autonomous community of Aragon, Spain
  - CD Cariñena, a football club from the city
- Cariñena (DO), a Spanish Denominación de Origen (DO) for wines located in Cariñena, Aragón
- Cariñena (grape), a red Spanish/French wine grape variety

== See also ==
- Campo de Cariñena, a comarca in Spain with Cariñena, Aragon as its capital
