= Cabezo de Altomira =

- Location within Spain

Highest point
- Elevation: 575 m (1,886 ft)
- Listing: List of mountains in Aragon
- Coordinates: 41°27′49″N 01°11′33″W

Geography
- Location: Campo de Cariñena (Aragon)

Geology
- Mountain type: Limestone

Climbing
- First ascent: Unknown
- Easiest route: Drive from Alfamén or Longares

Cabezo de Altomira is a mountain located about 4 km NE of the town of Alfamén, Campo de Cariñena comarca, Aragon, Spain.

It is an isolated hill, almost denuded of vegetation, that stands out in the flat landscape, even though the surrounding plain is already at an average elevation of 500 metres (1,640 ft). The Cabezo de Altomira offers an excellent lookout point over the surrounding plain of Cariñena and the Sierra de Algairén and Sierra de Vicort ranges further to the south.

There are ruins of an ancient Iberian settlement in the hill that have been excavated recently.

== See also ==
- Alfamén
- Campo de Cariñena
