= Valdejalón =

- Comarca
- Interactive map of Valdejalón
- Coordinates: 41°33′00″N 1°18′00″W
- Country: Spain
- Autonomous community: Aragon
- Province: Zaragoza
- Capital: La Almunia de Doña Godina
- Municipalities: List: See text

Area
  - Total: 933.3 km^{2} (360.3 sq mi)

Population
  - Total: 29,429
  - Density: 31.53/km^{2} (81.67/sq mi)
- Time zone: UTC+1 (CET)
  - Summer (DST): UTC+2 (CEST)

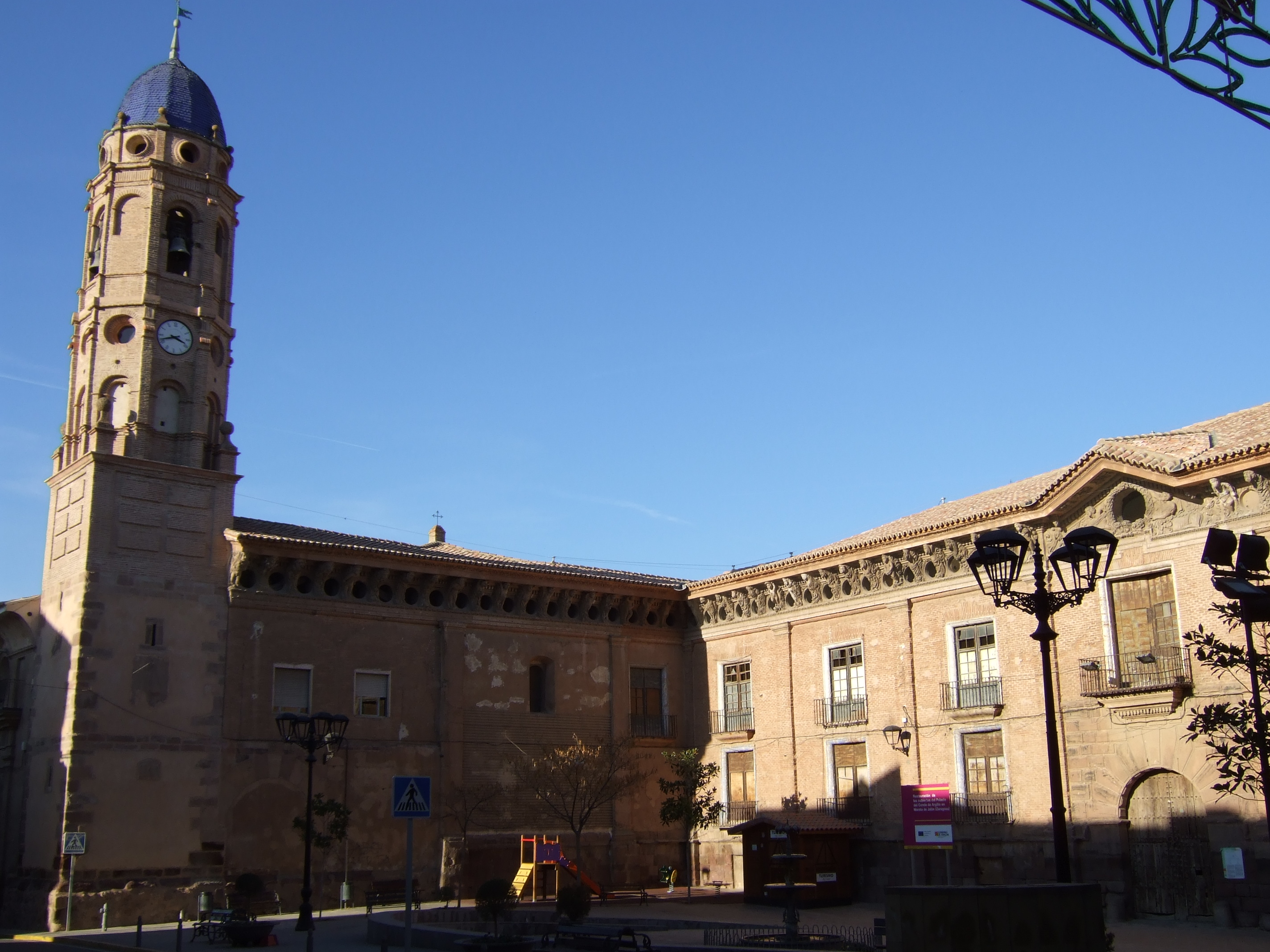
Morata de Jalón, palace of the Count of Morata

Valdejalón (Aragonese: Val de Xalón) is a comarca in Aragon, Spain. It is located in Zaragoza Province, in the transitional area between the Iberian System and the Ebro Valley.

The capital of Valdejalón is La Almunia de Doña Godina, located at the western end of Sierra de Algairén. This comarca is one of the main sites of the Mudéjar Architecture of Aragon.

== Municipalities ==
- Almonacid de la Sierra
- La Almunia de Doña Godina
- Alpartir
- Bardallur
- Calatorao
- Chodes
- Épila
- Lucena de Jalón
- Lumpiaque
- Morata de Jalón
- La Muela
- Plasencia de Jalón
- Ricla
- Rueda de Jalón
- Salillas de Jalón
- Santa Cruz de Grío
- Urrea de Jalón

== See also ==
- Comarcas of Aragon
