= Santa Cruz de Grío =

- Flag Coat of arms

- Location within Spain
- Coordinates: 41°22′N 1°26′W
- Country: Spain
- Autonomous community: Aragon
- Province: Zaragoza
- Comarca: Valdejalón

Area
  - Total: 19.65 km^{2} (7.59 sq mi)

Population (2025-01-01)
  - Total: 95
  - Density: 4.8/km^{2} (13/sq mi)
- Time zone: UTC+1 (CET)
  - Summer (DST): UTC+2 (CEST)

Santa Cruz de Grío is a municipality located in the province of Zaragoza, Aragon, Spain. According to the 2010 census, the municipality has a population of 164 inhabitants.

This town is located between the Sierra de Vicort and the Sierra de Algairén in the Grio River valley.

The abandoned village of Aldehuela de Grío, also known as Aldehuela de Santa Cruz, is located within its municipal term.

== See also ==
- List of municipalities in Zaragoza
