= Mezalocha =

Coordinates: 41°26′N 1°05′W

- municipality
- Flag Coat of arms
- Interactive map of Mezalocha
- Country: Spain
- Autonomous community: Aragon
- Province: Zaragoza
- Comarca: Campo de Cariñena

Area
  - Total: 60 km^{2} (23 sq mi)
- Elevation: 484 m (1,588 ft)

Population (2025-01-01)
  - Total: 197
  - Density: 3.3/km^{2} (8.5/sq mi)
- Time zone: UTC+1 (CET)
  - Summer (DST): UTC+2 (CEST)

Mezalocha is a municipality in the province of Zaragoza, Aragon, Spain. According to the 2025 census (INE), the municipality has 197 inhabitants.

It is located near Muel town.

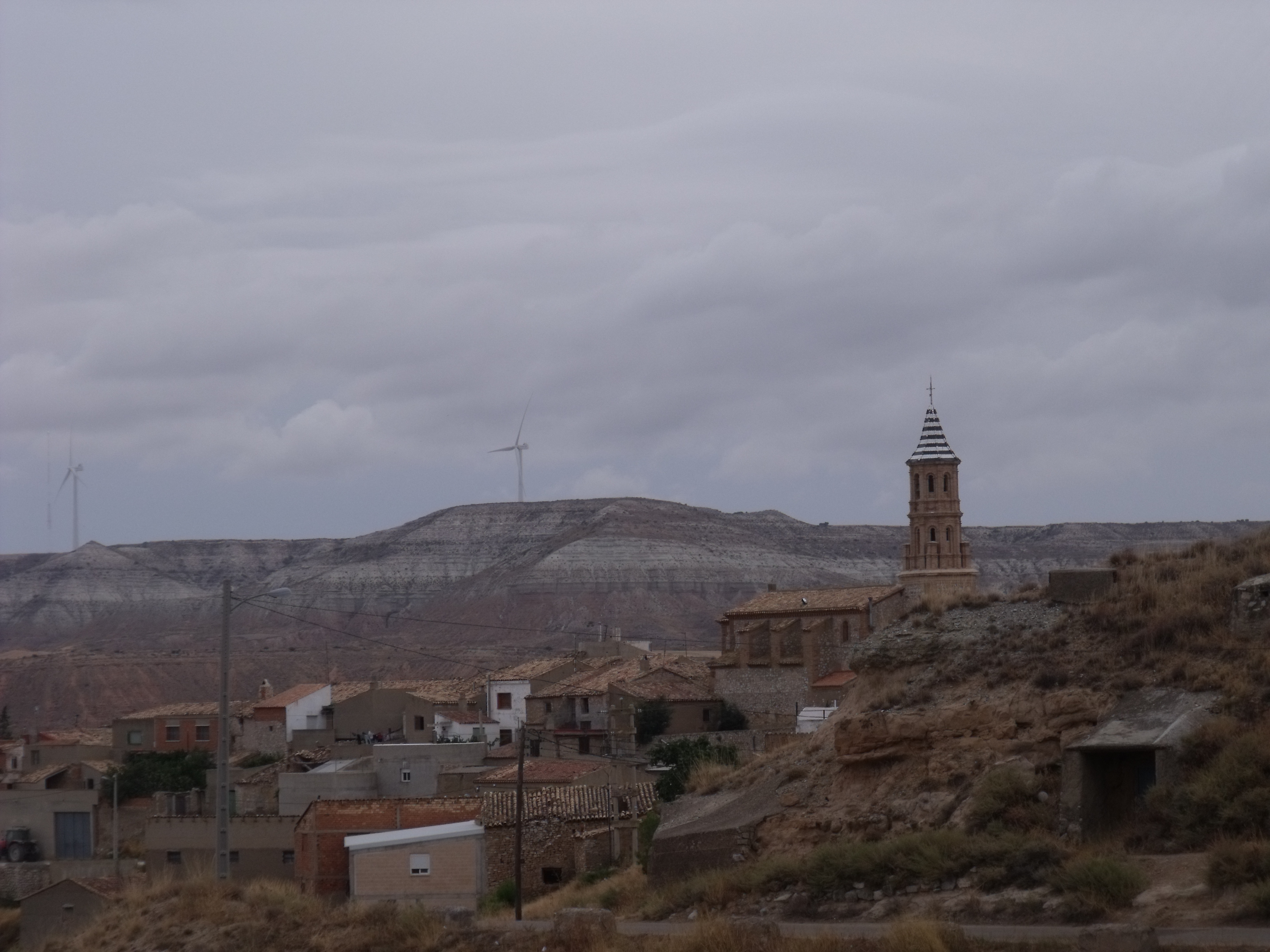
View of Mezalocha Village

== See also ==
- List of municipalities in Zaragoza
