= Aguarón =

Aguarón, Spain
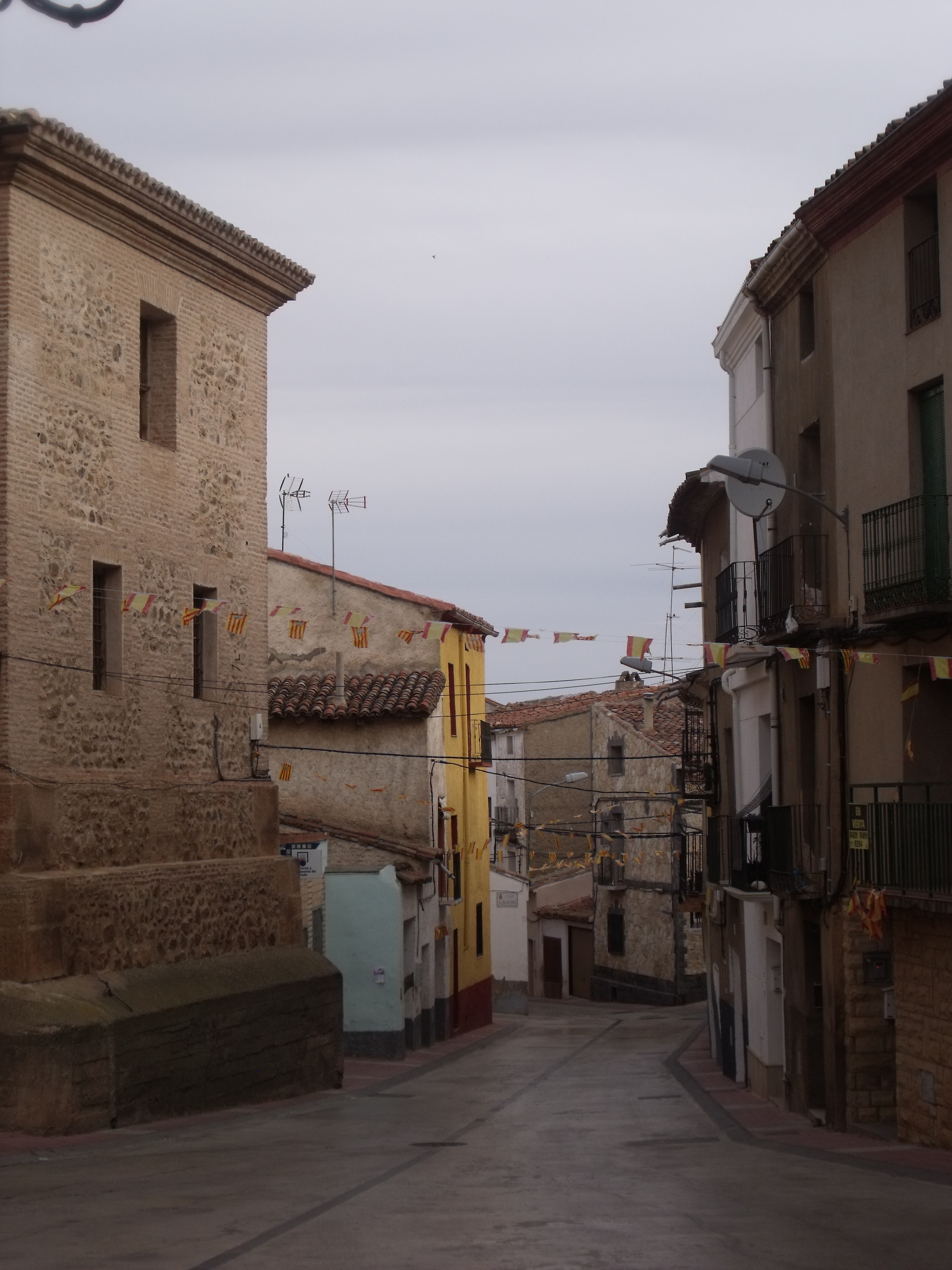

- Flag Coat of arms

- Location within Aragon Location within Spain Location within Europe
- Country: Spain
- Autonomous community: Aragon
- Province: Zaragoza
- Municipality: Aguarón

Area
  - Total: 36 km^{2} (14 sq mi)
- Elevation: 649 m (2,129 ft)

Population (2025-01-01)
  - Total: 602
  - Density: 17/km^{2} (43/sq mi)
- Time zone: UTC+1 (CET)
  - Summer (DST): UTC+2 (CEST)

Aguarón is a municipality located in the province of Zaragoza, Aragon, Spain. According to the 2004 census (INE), the municipality has a population of 776 inhabitants.

This town is located near the Sierra de Algairén in the comarca of Campo de Cariñena.

== See also ==
- List of municipalities in Zaragoza
