= Codos, Aragon =

- municipality
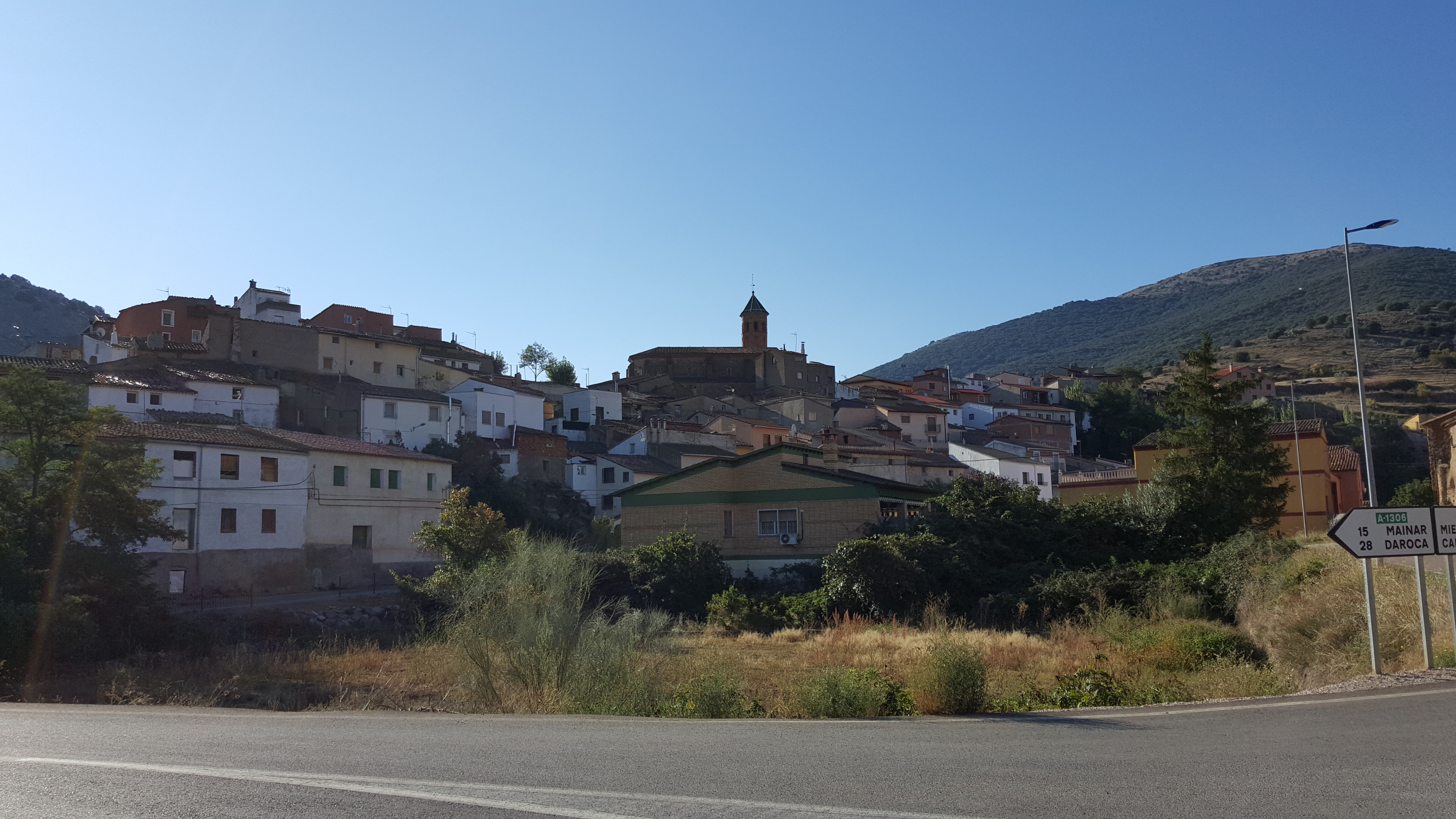

- Flag Coat of arms

- Location within Aragon Location within Spain Location within Europe
- Country: Spain
- Autonomous community: Aragon
- Province: Zaragoza
- Comarca: Comunidad de Calatayud

Area
  - Total: 62.7 km^{2} (24.2 sq mi)
- Elevation: 751 m (2,464 ft)

Population (2025-01-01)
  - Total: 237
  - Density: 3.78/km^{2} (9.79/sq mi)
- Time zone: UTC+1 (CET)
  - Summer (DST): UTC+2 (CEST)

Codos is a municipality located in the province of Zaragoza, Aragon, Spain. According to the 2009 census (INE), the municipality has a population of 260 inhabitants.

This town is located between the Sierra de Vicort and the Sierra de Algairén in the Grio River valley.

== See also ==
- List of municipalities in Zaragoza
