= Martín de Soria =

Spanish Gothic painter

Main altarpiece of the Church of San Salvador, Ejea de los Caballeros

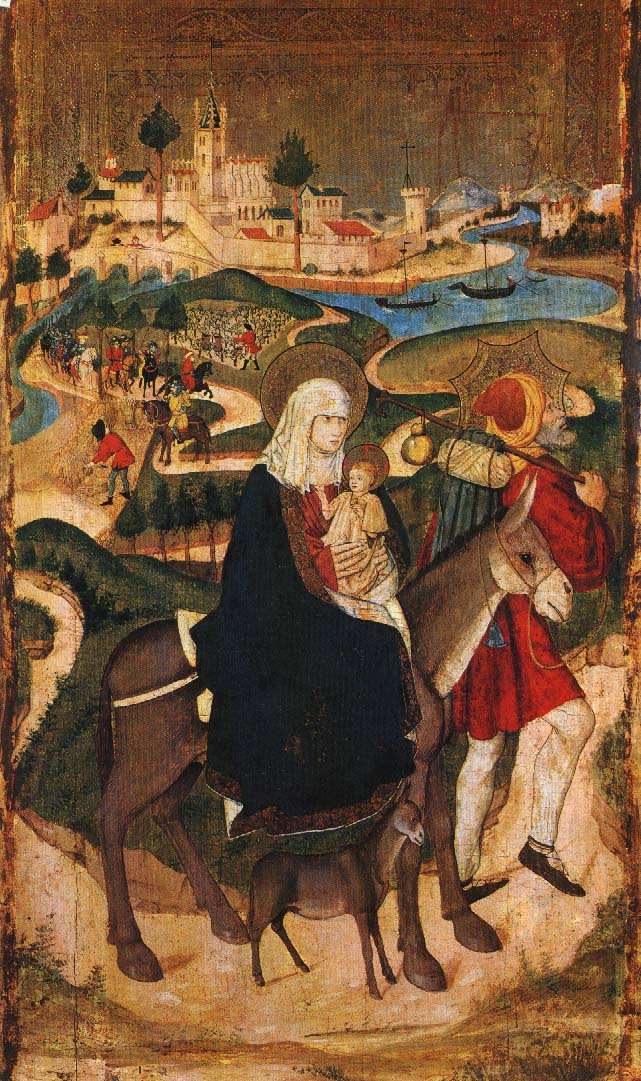
The Flight from Egypt

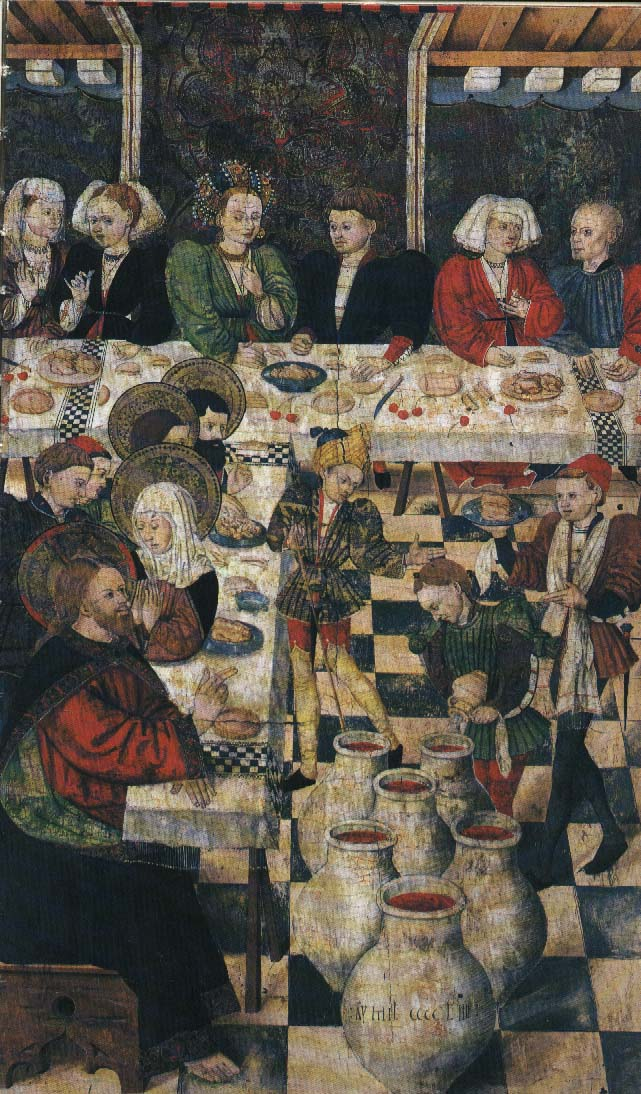
The Wedding at Cana

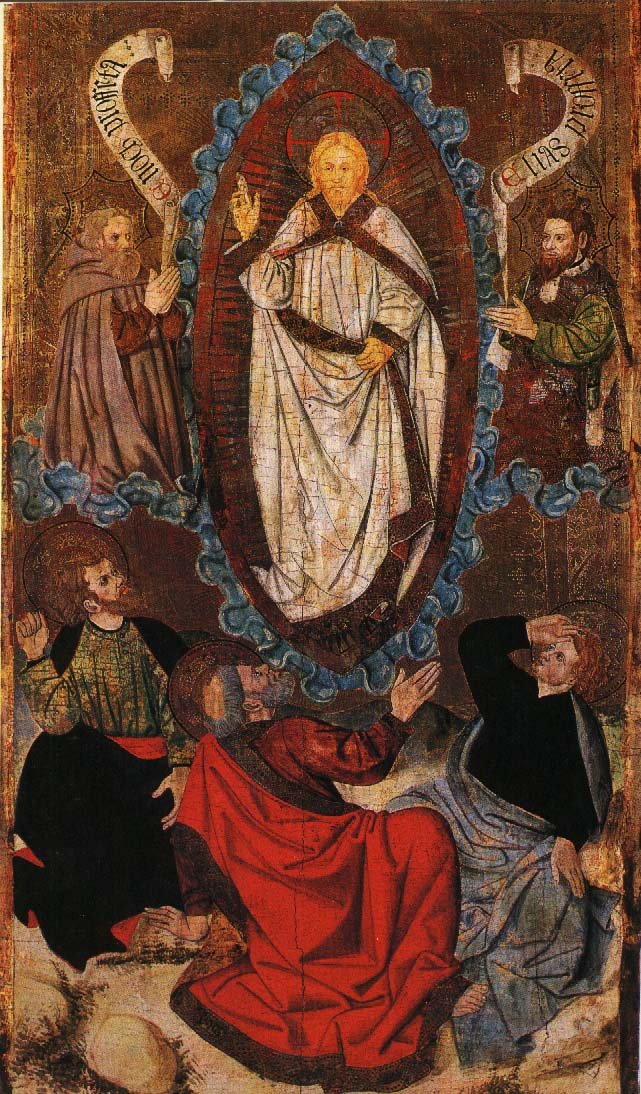
The Transfiguration

Martín de Soria (fl. 1449 -1487) was a Spanish Gothic painter in the Flemish style; active in the Kingdom of Aragón. His style is related to that of Jaume Huguet and his works have sometimes been confused with that painter's youthful efforts.

== Life and work ==
He appears to have begun his artistic education in the workshop of his uncle, Blasco de Grañén, who also worked as his agent. In 1457, he and Juan Rius (fl.1455-1482) were commissioned to create an altarpiece for the town of Aguilón, with his uncle as guarantor.

In 1459, following his uncle's death, he completed altarpieces at Épila and Ejea de los Caballeros that his uncle had left unfinished. At the latter, in the Iglesia de San Salvador, which was not completed until 1476, a cleaning that was performed in 1986 uncovered evidence that the work may be entirely Soria's.

Also in 1459, he contracted with the merchant, Miguel de Baltueña, to create an altarpiece for his personal chapel at the Iglesia de San Pablo in Zaragoza. Some of the panels, damaged by old, inexpert restorations are at the Zaragoza Museum. Between 1469 and 1471 he produced a "Virgen del Campo" in Asín which was once attributed to Huguet.

It is not until 1485 that another work can be named as his with certainty. This is the main altarpiece of the church in Pallaruelo, Huesca, which was signed and dated. Most of the panels were destroyed in 1936, during the Spanish Civil War. The surviving ones may be seen at the local Diocesan Museum. The others are known only through photographs.
