= Ricla =

Coordinates: 41°31′N 1°24′W

- municipality
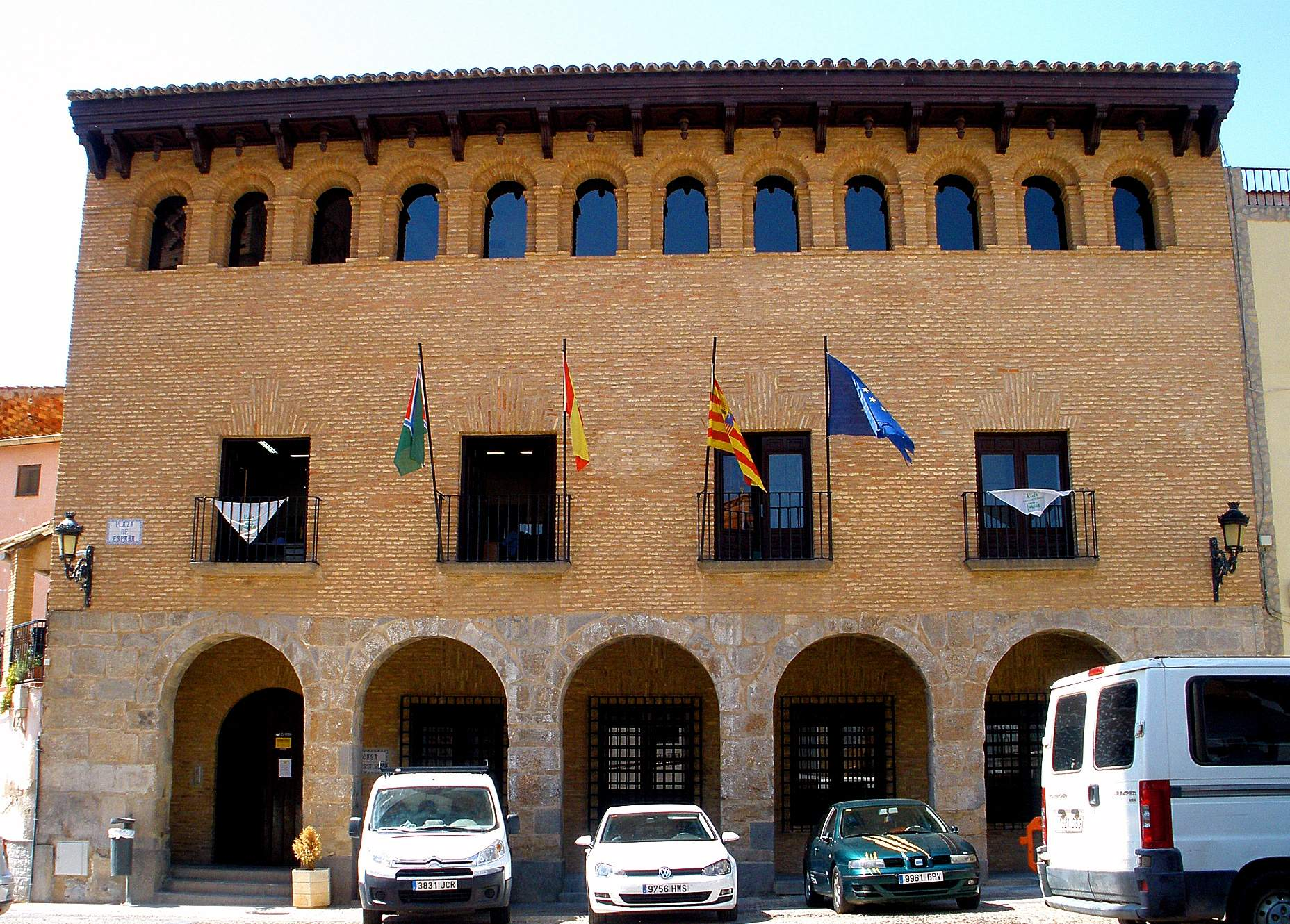
- Town hall

- Flag Coat of arms
- Interactive map of Ricla
- Country: Spain
- Autonomous community: Aragon
- Province: Zaragoza
- Comarca: Valdejalón

Area
  - Total: 90 km^{2} (35 sq mi)

Population (2025-01-01)
  - Total: 3,019
  - Density: 34/km^{2} (87/sq mi)
- Time zone: UTC+1 (CET)
  - Summer (DST): UTC+2 (CEST)

Ricla is a municipality located in the province of Zaragoza, Aragon, Spain. According to the 2004 census (INE), the municipality has a population of 2,653 inhabitants.

== See also ==
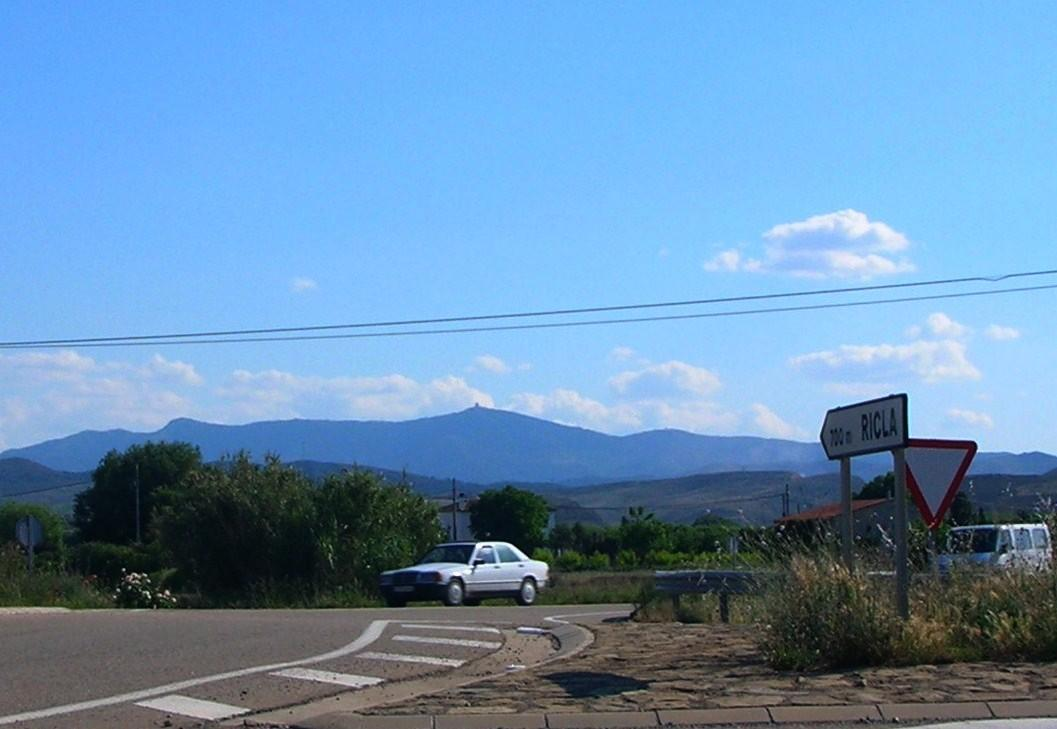
View of Sierra de Vicort range from near Ricla

- Valdejalón
- List of municipalities in Zaragoza
