= Cyperus acutiusculus =

Scientific classification
- Kingdom: Plantae
- Clade: Tracheophytes
- Clade: Angiosperms
- Clade: Monocots
- Clade: Commelinids
- Order: Poales
- Family: Cyperaceae
- Genus: Cyperus
- Species: C. acutiusculus

Binomial name
- Cyperus acutiusculus Lag., 1816

Species of sedge

Cyperus acutiusculus is a species of sedge that is native to Oklahoma, Texas, and Arizona to Central America and Peru to northwest Argentina.

== See also ==
- List of Cyperus species
