= Villanueva de Huerva =

- Flag Coat of arms

- Location within Spain
- Coordinates: 41°12′N 1°17′W
- Country: Spain
- Autonomous community: Aragon
- Province: Zaragoza
- Comarca: Campo de Cariñena

Area
  - Total: 78.35 km^{2} (30.25 sq mi)
- Elevation: 531 m (1,742 ft)

Population (2025-01-01)
  - Total: 360
  - Density: 4.6/km^{2} (12/sq mi)
- Time zone: UTC+1 (CET)
  - Summer (DST): UTC+2 (CEST)

Villanueva de Huerva is a municipality located in the province of Zaragoza, Aragon, Spain. According to the 2010 census, the municipality had a population of 562 inhabitants.

This town is named after the Huerva River.

== See also ==
- Campo de Cariñena
- List of municipalities in Zaragoza
