= Cosuenda =

- municipality
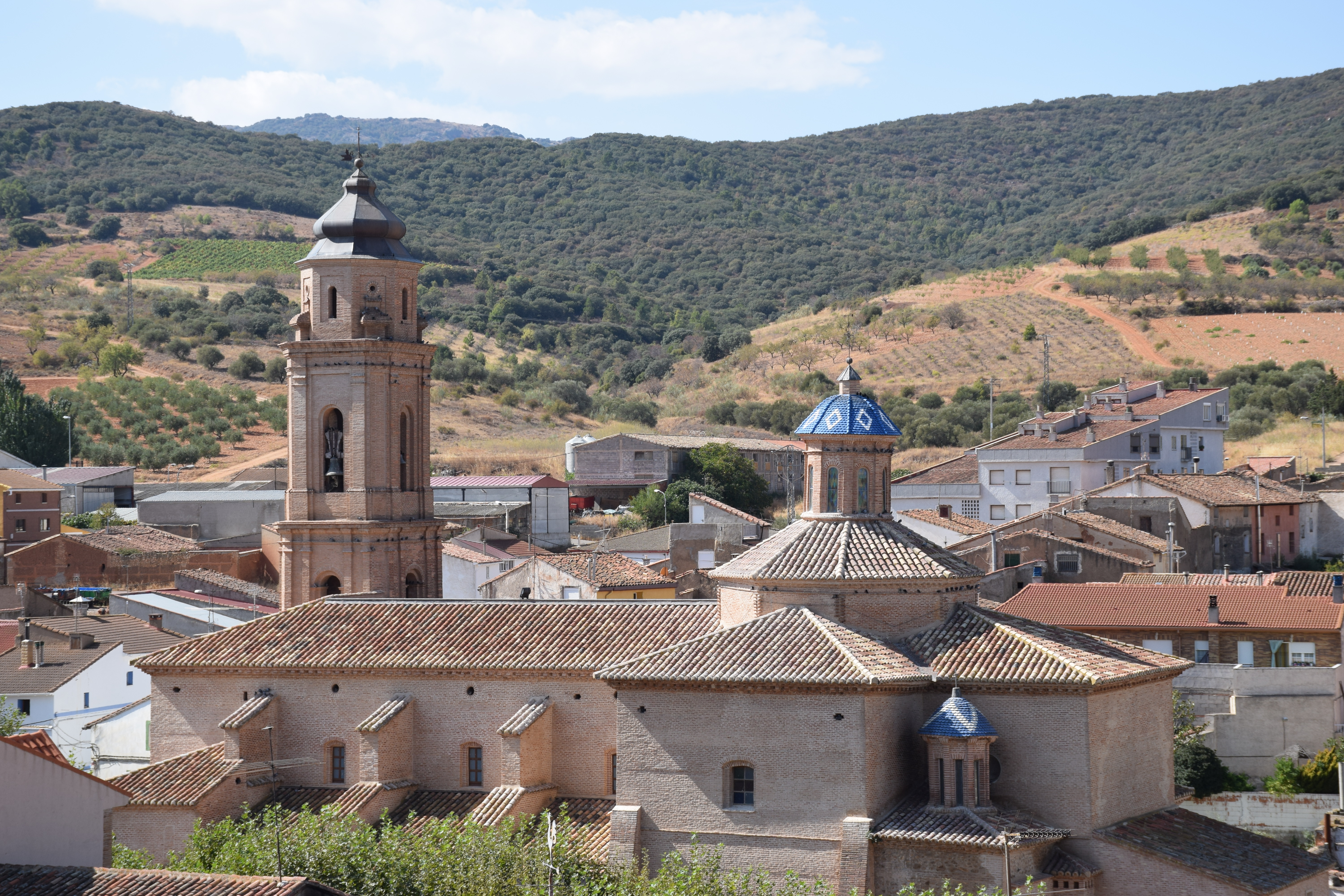

- Flag Coat of arms

- Location within Aragon Location within Spain Location within Europe
- Country: Spain
- Autonomous community: Aragon
- Province: Zaragoza
- Municipality: Cosuenda

Area
  - Total: 31 km^{2} (12 sq mi)
- Elevation: 616 m (2,021 ft)

Population (2025-01-01)
  - Total: 344
  - Density: 11/km^{2} (29/sq mi)
- Time zone: UTC+1 (CET)
  - Summer (DST): UTC+2 (CEST)

Cosuenda is a municipality located in the province of Zaragoza, Aragon, Spain. According to the 2004 census (INE), the municipality has a population of 392 inhabitants.

This town is located at the feet of the Sierra de Algairén in the comarca of Campo de Cariñena.

== See also ==
- List of municipalities in Zaragoza
