= Encinacorba =

- municipality
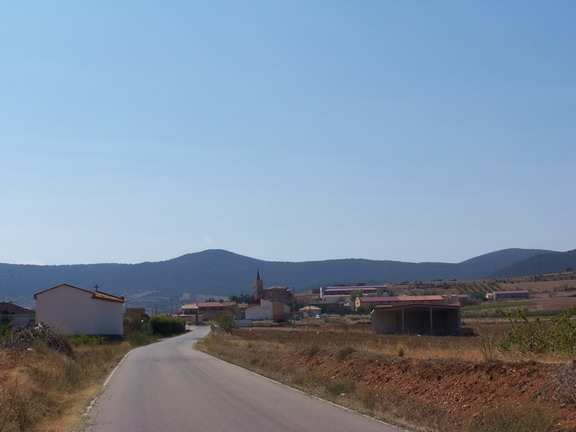

- Flag Coat of arms

- Location within Aragon Location within Spain Location within Europe
- Coordinates: 41°17′N 1°16′W
- Country: Spain
- Autonomous community: Aragon
- Province: Zaragoza

Area
  - Total: 36 km^{2} (14 sq mi)
- Elevation: 762 m (2,500 ft)

Population (2025-01-01)
  - Total: 176
  - Density: 4.9/km^{2} (13/sq mi)
- Time zone: UTC+1 (CET)
  - Summer (DST): UTC+2 (CEST)

Encinacorba is a municipality located in the province of Zaragoza, Aragon, Spain. According to the 2004 census (INE), the municipality has a population of 294 inhabitants.

This town is located near the Sierra de Algairén in the comarca of Campo de Cariñena.

== See also ==
- List of municipalities in Zaragoza
