= La Muela =

- municipality
- Flag Coat of arms

- Location within Aragon Location within Spain Location within Europe
- Coordinates: 41°34′45″N 1°7′0″W
- Country: Spain
- Autonomous community: Aragon
- Province: Zaragoza

Area
  - Total: 143 km^{2} (55 sq mi)

Population (2025-01-01)
  - Total: 6,737
  - Density: 47.1/km^{2} (122/sq mi)
- Time zone: UTC+1 (CET)
  - Summer (DST): UTC+2 (CEST)

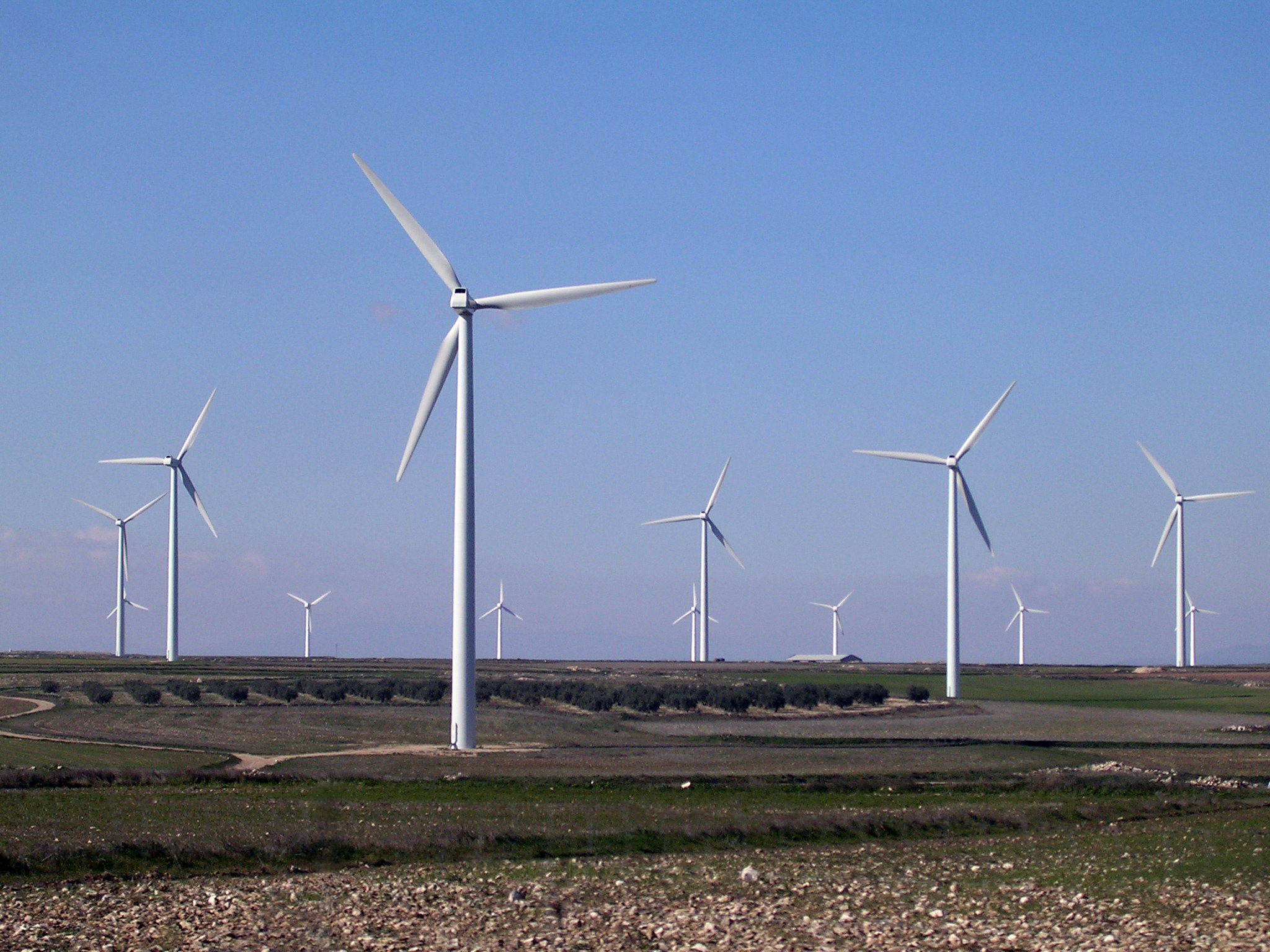
Wind farm near La Muela

La Muela is a municipality located in the Valdejalón comarca, province of Zaragoza, Aragon, Spain. According to the INE, La Muela had a population of 5,894 in 2020, increased from 5,479 in 2018 and from 4,928 in 2009.

It is the location of a wind farm that provides power to the city of Zaragoza and the surrounding area.

== See also ==
- List of municipalities in Zaragoza
