= Blasco de Grañén =

Spanish painter (c. 1400 – 1459)

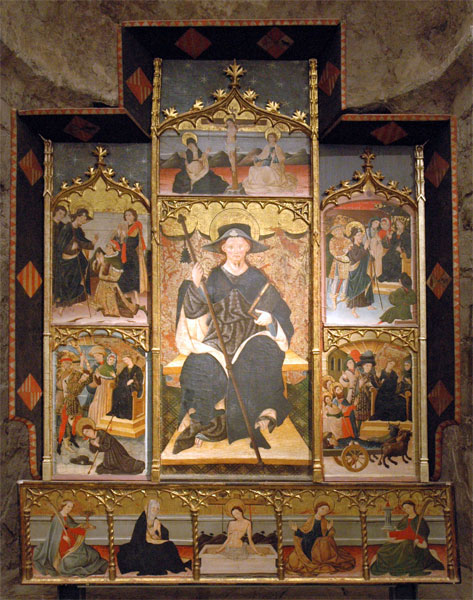
Altarpiece venerating St. James

Blasco de Grañén (c. 1400, Zaragoza – October 1459, Zaragoza) (known as: "Master of Lanaja") was a Gothic painter active in Aragon from 1422. He became the appointed painter to Juan II of Aragon. His notable assistant, among others, was Pedro García de Benavarre, with whom he made the altarpieces for the monastery of San Pedro de Siresa in 1445.

Grañén was a follower of Juan de Leví. In 1435, he made the altarpiece for the Basilica of Our Lady of the Pillar in Zaragoza. Two years later he created an altarpiece for the altar of Santiago at the Iglesia de Santa María la Mayor in Épila. He began the altarpiece for the Church of San Salvador in Ejea de los Caballeros in 1440 but it was unfinished at the time of his death; his nephew, Martín de Soria, completed it. He died in October 1459, leaving his widow, Dona Blanca de Tena.
