= Tobed =

Coordinates: 41°20′N 1°24′W

- municipality
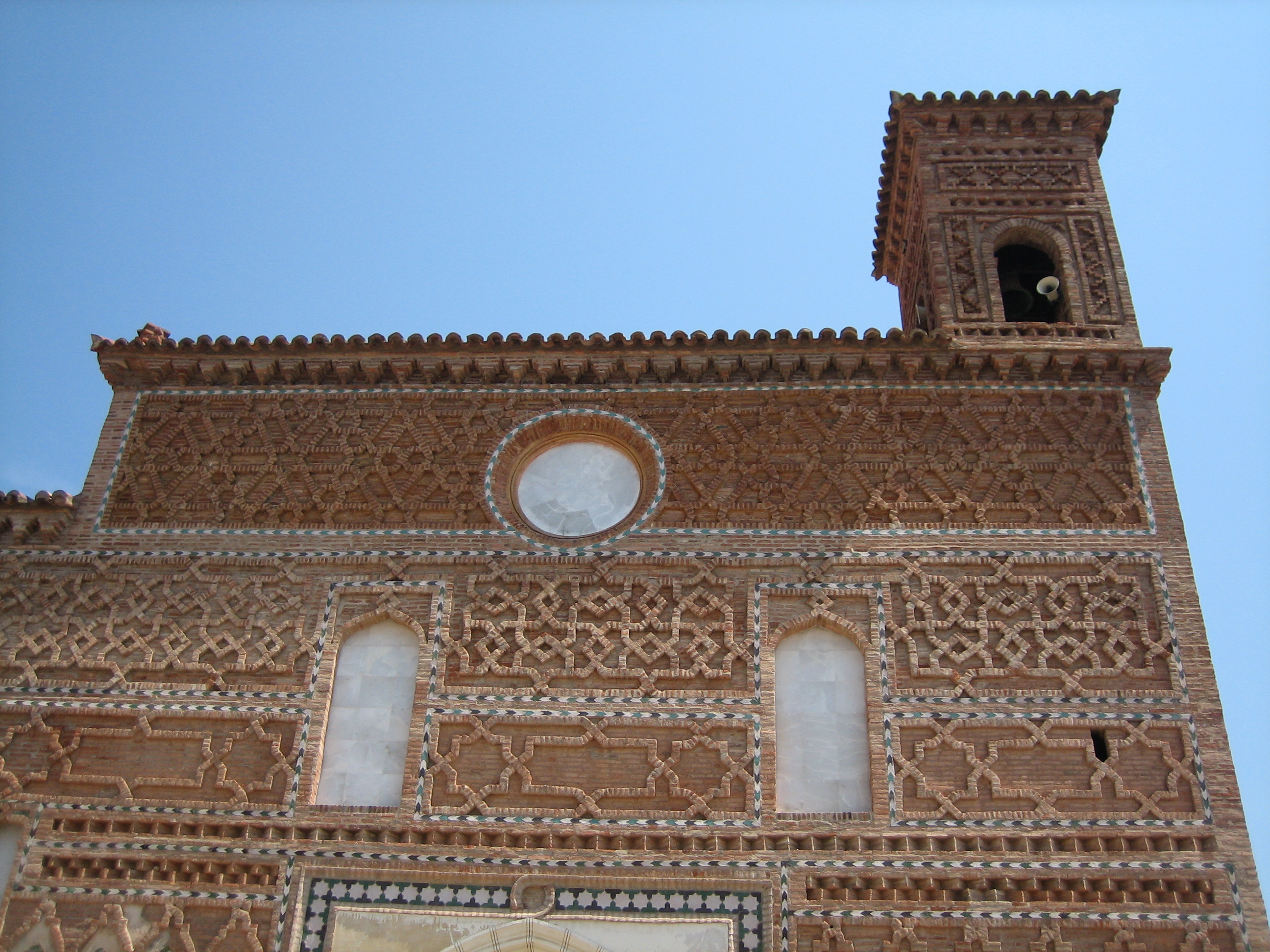
- Church of Santa María de Tobed

- Flag Coat of arms
- Interactive map of Tobed
- Country: Spain
- Autonomous community: Aragon
- Province: Zaragoza

Area
  - Total: 37 km^{2} (14 sq mi)
- Elevation: 638 m (2,093 ft)

Population (2025-01-01)
  - Total: 196
  - Density: 5.3/km^{2} (14/sq mi)
- Time zone: UTC+1 (CET)
  - Summer (DST): UTC+2 (CEST)

Tobed is a municipality located in the province of Zaragoza, Aragon, Spain. As of 2018, the municipality had a population of 214 inhabitants.

This town is located between the Sierra de Vicort and the Sierra de Algairén in the Grio River valley.

== See also ==
- List of municipalities in Zaragoza
