= El Frasno =

- municipality
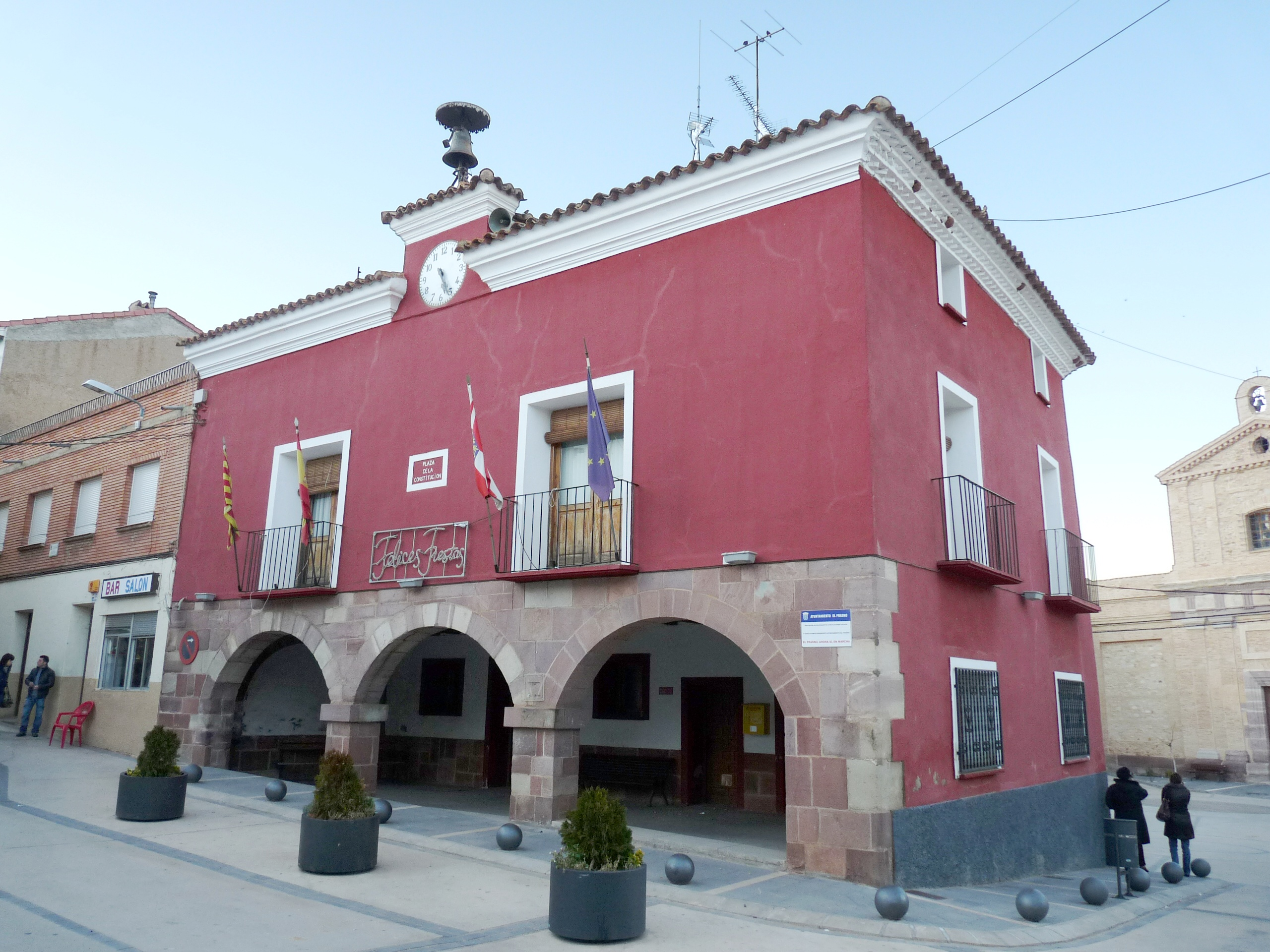

- Flag Coat of arms

- Location within Aragon Location within Spain Location within Europe
- Country: Spain
- Autonomous community: Aragon
- Province: Zaragoza
- Comarca: Comunidad de Calatayud

Area
  - Total: 48.53 km^{2} (18.74 sq mi)
- Elevation: 681 m (2,234 ft)

Population (2025-01-01)
  - Total: 370
  - Density: 7.6/km^{2} (20/sq mi)
- Time zone: UTC+1 (CET)
  - Summer (DST): UTC+2 (CEST)

El Frasno is a municipality in the province of Zaragoza, Aragon, Spain. According to the 2004 census (INE), the municipality had a population of 476 inhabitants.

This town is located in the Sierra de Vicort range close to the Carretera Nacional N-II highway. The Puerto del Frasno mountain pass is named after it. According to the 2010 census the town had a population of 141 inhabitants.

== Villages ==
- El Frasno
- Aluenda, located further to the SW by the highway as well.
- Inogés
- Pietas

== See also ==
- Comunidad de Calatayud
- List of municipalities in Zaragoza
