= Almonacid de la Sierra =

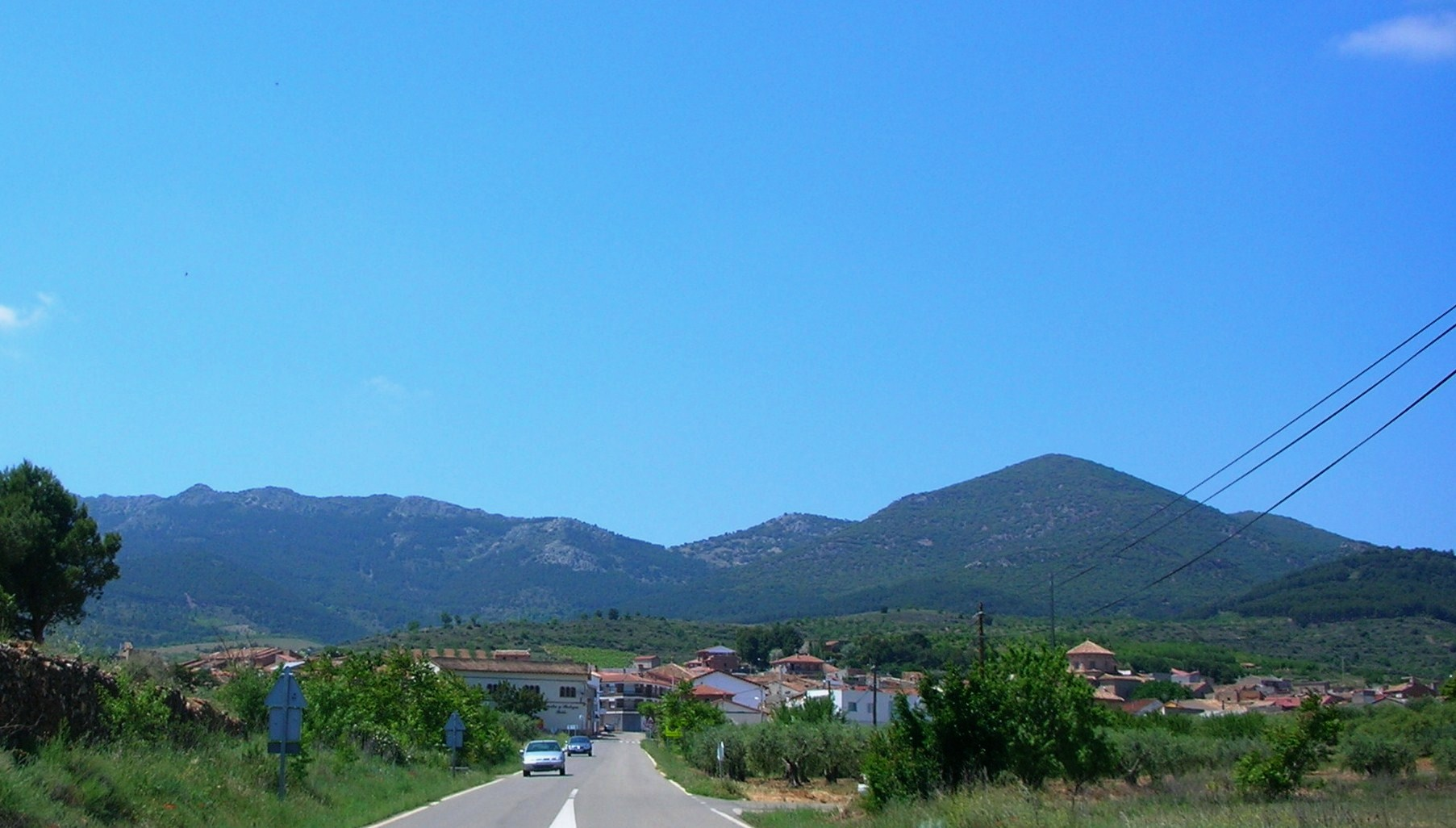
- Sierra de Algairén rising behind Almonacid de la Sierra

- Flag Coat of arms

- Location within Aragon Location within Spain Location within Europe
- Country: Spain
- Autonomous community: Aragon
- Province: Zaragoza
- Municipality: Almonacid de la Sierra

Area
  - Total: 54 km^{2} (21 sq mi)
- Elevation: 598 m (1,962 ft)

Population (2025-01-01)
  - Total: 756
  - Density: 14/km^{2} (36/sq mi)
- Time zone: UTC+1 (CET)
  - Summer (DST): UTC+2 (CEST)
- Climate: Cfb

Almonacid de la Sierra (Aragonese: Almonecir de la Sierra) is a municipality located in the province of Zaragoza, Aragon, Spain. According to the 2004 census (INE), the municipality has a population of 894 inhabitants. It has a total area of 54 km squared.

This town is located near the Sierra de Algairén, Sistema Ibérico, in the comarca of Campo de Cariñena.

== See also ==
- List of municipalities in Zaragoza
