= Sediles =

Coordinates: 41°21′N 1°32′W

- municipality
- Flag Coat of arms
- Interactive map of Sediles
- Country: Spain
- Autonomous community: Aragon
- Province: Zaragoza

Area
  - Total: 11 km^{2} (4.2 sq mi)

Population (2025-01-01)
  - Total: 109
  - Density: 9.9/km^{2} (26/sq mi)
- Time zone: UTC+1 (CET)
  - Summer (DST): UTC+2 (CEST)

Sediles is a municipality located in the Comunidad de Calatayud, province of Zaragoza, Aragon, Spain. According to the 2004 census (INE), the municipality has a population of 93 inhabitants.

The town is located at the feet of the Sierra de Vicort range.

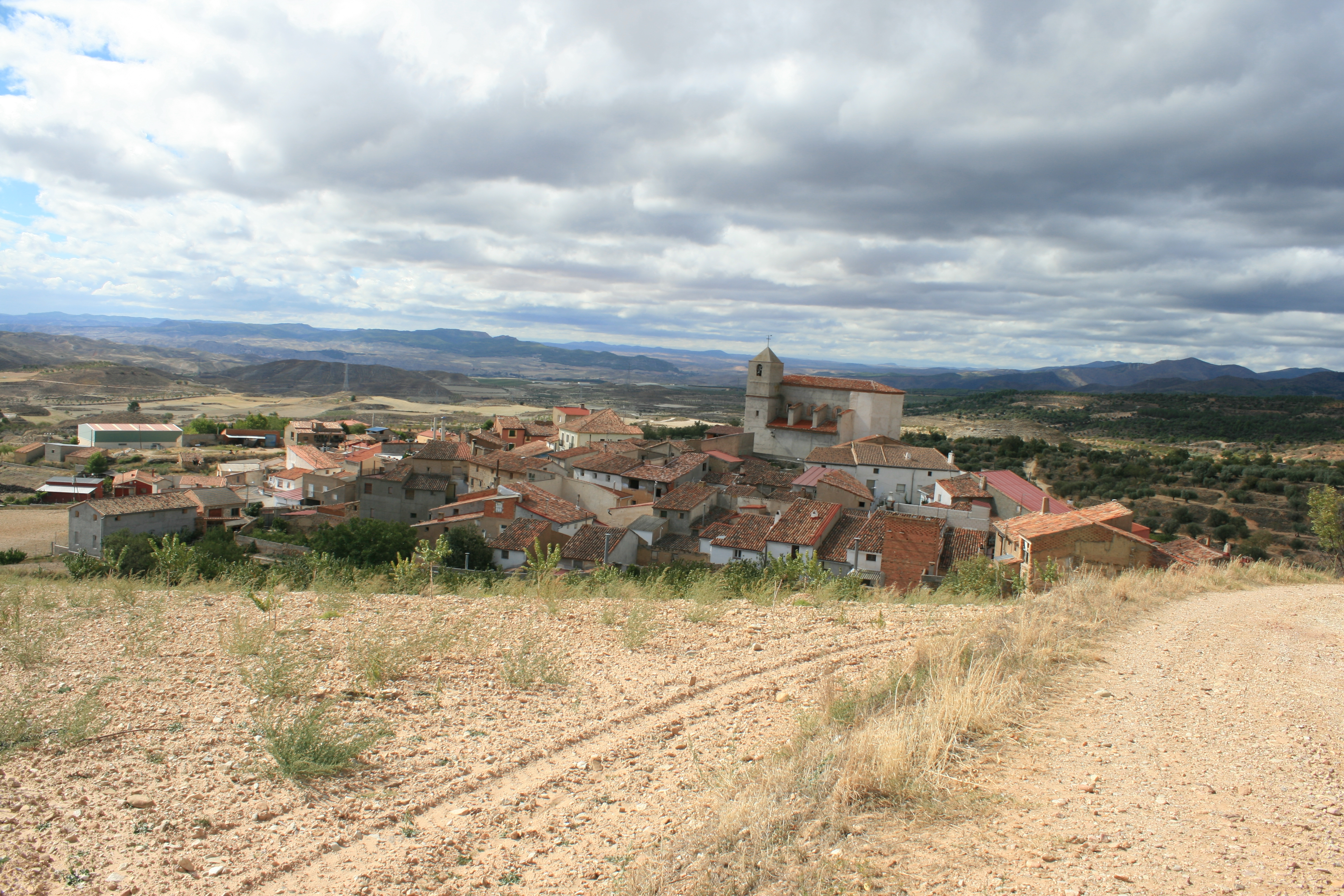
View of Sediles, Zaragoza, Spain

== See also ==
- List of municipalities in Zaragoza
