= Alfamén =

Alfamén, Spain
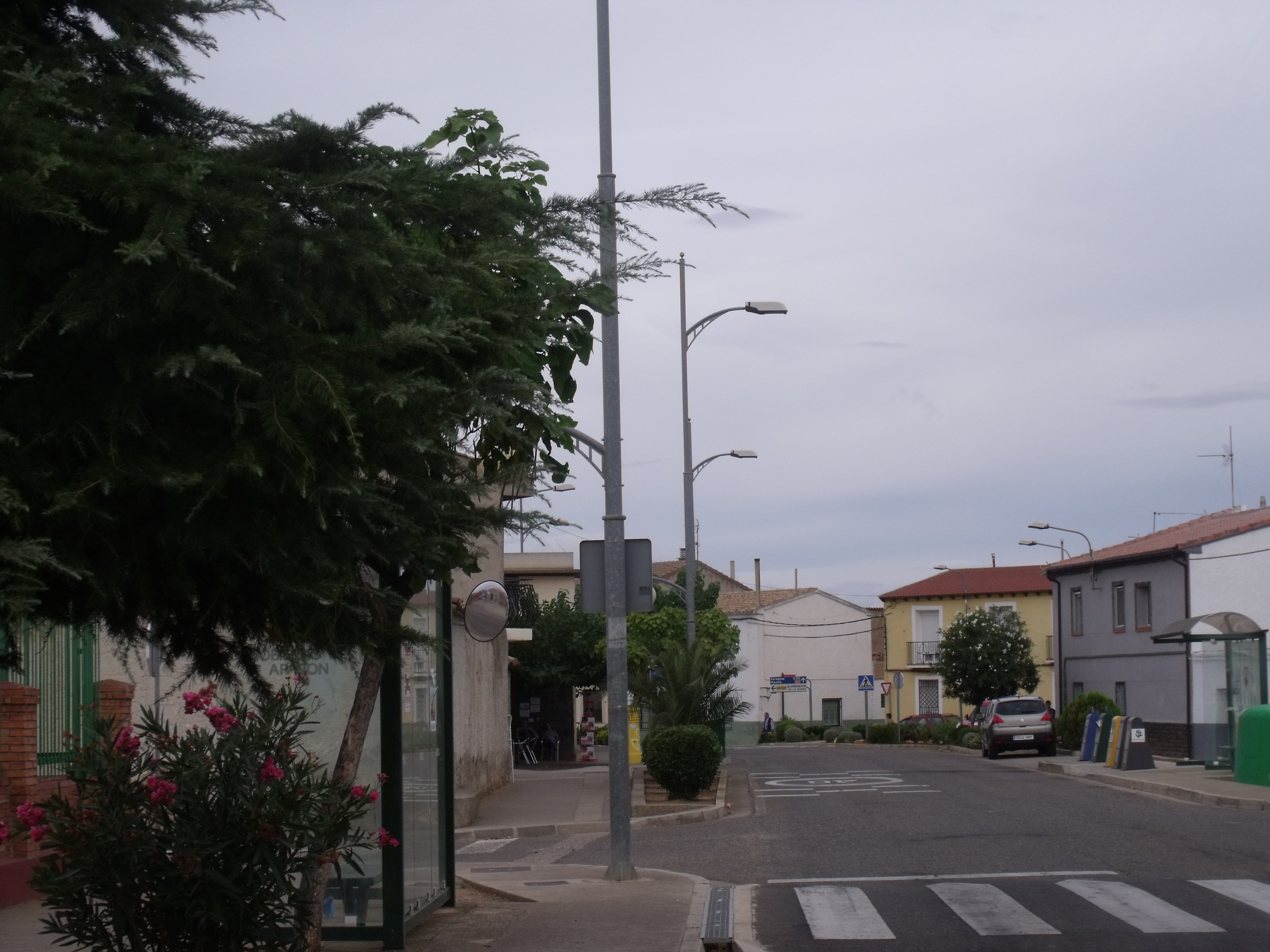

- Flag Coat of arms

- Location within Aragon Location within Spain Location within Europe
- Country: Spain
- Autonomous community: Aragon
- Province: Zaragoza
- Comarca: Campo de Cariñena

Area
  - Total: 102 km^{2} (39 sq mi)
- Elevation: 373 m (1,224 ft)

Population (2025-01-01)
  - Total: 1,470
  - Density: 14.4/km^{2} (37.3/sq mi)
- Time zone: UTC+1 (CET)
  - Summer (DST): UTC+2 (CEST)

Alfamén is a municipality located in the province of Zaragoza, Aragon, Spain. According to the 2016 census (INE), the municipality has a population of 1,466 inhabitants Its demonym is vena. This town is reputed for its Melons and watermelons.

There are ruins of an ancient Iberian settlement in the Cabezo de Altomira hill, located about 4 km NE of the town.

== See also ==
- Campo de Cariñena
- List of municipalities in Zaragoza
