= Chodes =

- municipality
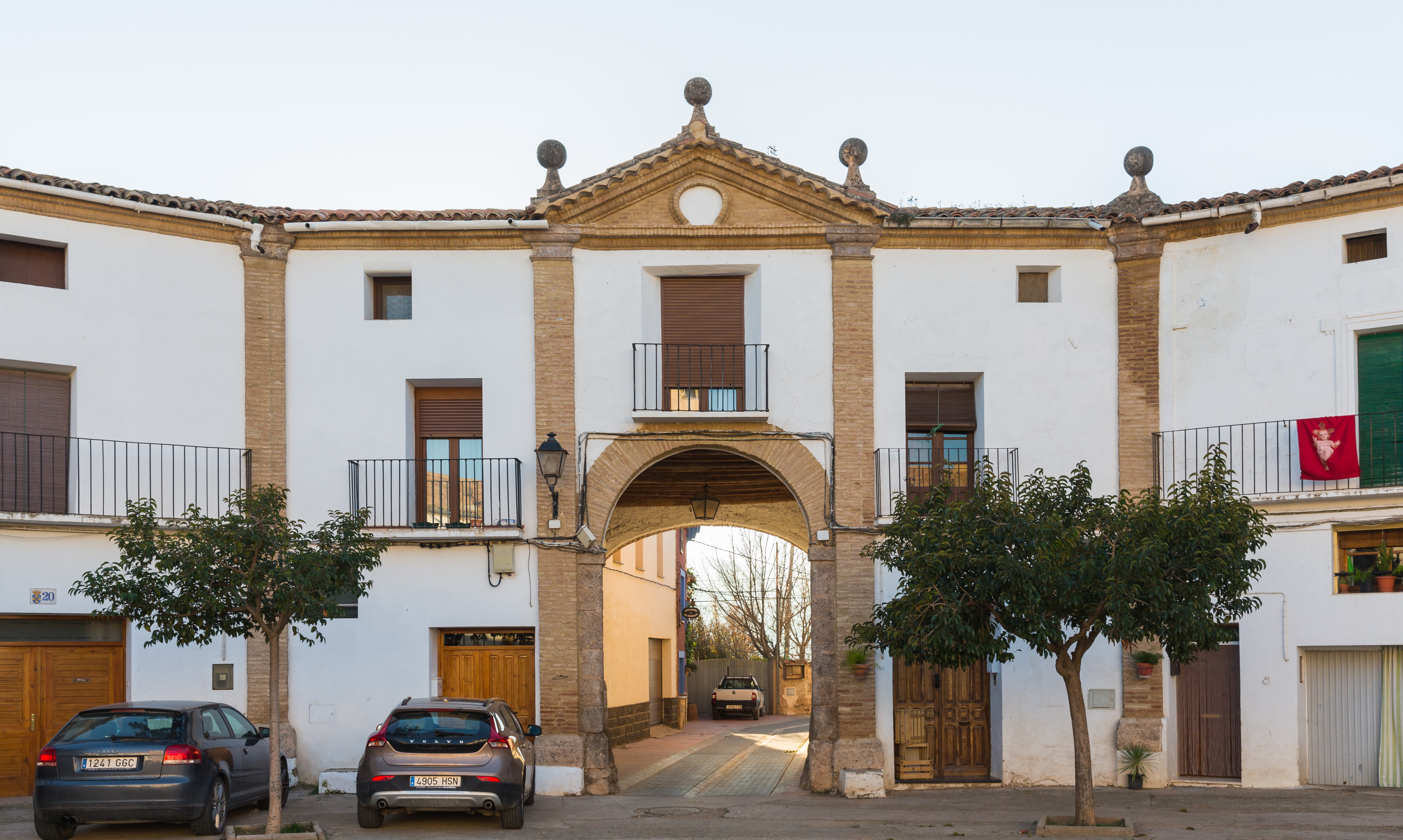

- Flag Coat of arms

- Location within Aragon Location within Spain Location within Europe
- Country: Spain
- Autonomous community: Aragon
- Province: Zaragoza
- Comarca: Valdejalón

Area
  - Total: 16 km^{2} (6.2 sq mi)

Population (2025-01-01)
  - Total: 98
  - Density: 6.1/km^{2} (16/sq mi)
- Time zone: UTC+1 (CET)
  - Summer (DST): UTC+2 (CEST)

Chodes is a municipality in the province of Zaragoza, Aragon, Spain. As of 2007, Chodes had a population of 152. The municipality has an area of 16 square kilometres (6.2 sq mi), and is located along the Jalón River and the Isuela River.

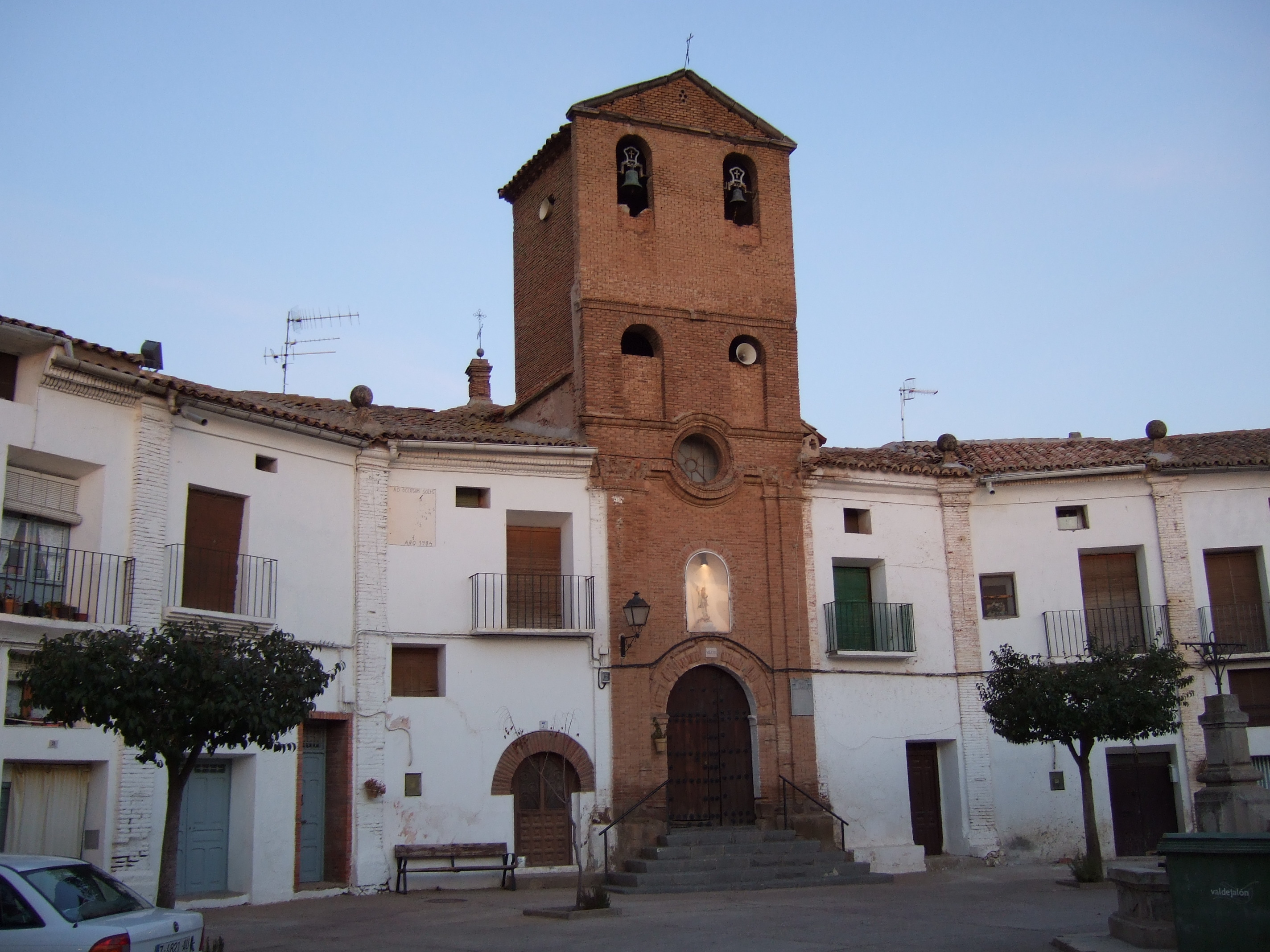
Plaza Ochavada and church in Chodes

Location of Chodes in Spain

== See also ==
- List of municipalities in Zaragoza
