= La Almunia de Doña Godina =

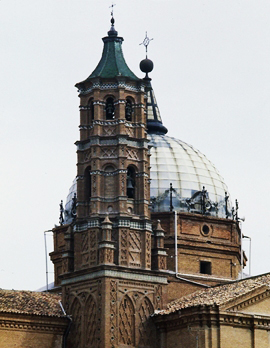
- Church of Nuestra Señora de la Asunción.

- Flag Coat of arms
- Interactive map of La Almunia de Doña Godina
- Location within Aragon Location within Spain
- Coordinates: 41°28′38″N 1°22′34″W
- Country: Spain
- Autonomous community: Aragon
- Province: Zaragoza
- Comarca: Valdejalón

Government
  - Mayor: Victoriano Herraiz Franco

Area
  - Total: 56.65 km^{2} (21.87 sq mi)
- Elevation: 336 m (1,102 ft)

Population (2025-01-01)
  - Total: 8,080
  - Density: 143/km^{2} (369/sq mi)
- Demonym: Almunienses
- Time zone: UTC+1 (CET)
  - Summer (DST): UTC+2 (CEST)
- Website: Official website

La Almunia de Doña Godina is a municipality in the province of Zaragoza, Aragon, Spain.

This town is located by the E90 (N II) Highway. It is home to the church of Nuestra Señora de la Asunción, rebuilt from 1754; it has maintained the original Mudéjar square-plan tower (14th century), which has a height of 40 meters. Other sights include the complex of San Juan de Jerusalén, the hermitage of Nuestra Señora de Cabañas and the convent of St. Lawrence.

== See also ==
- Valdejalón
- List of municipalities in Zaragoza
