= Mariano Lagasca =

Spanish botanist, writer and doctor

Mariano Lagasca y Segura (Mariano la Gasca)
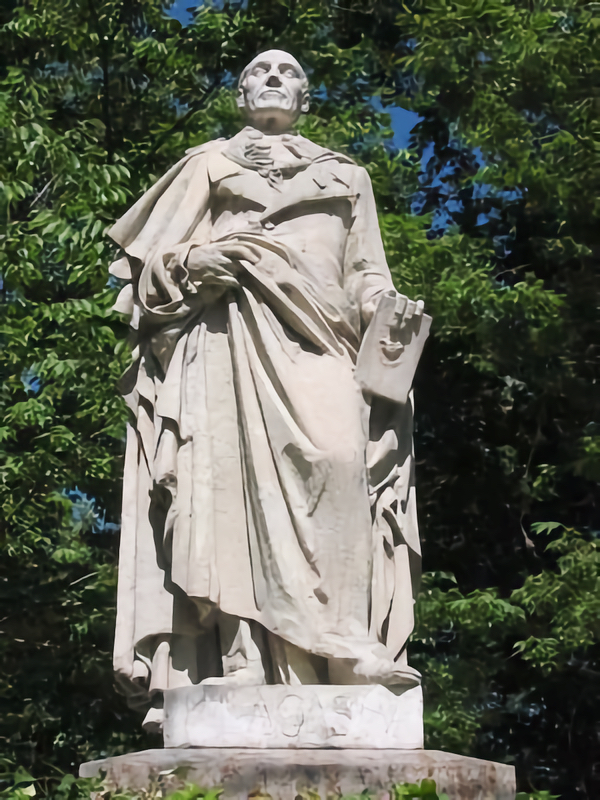
- Statue by Ponciano Ponzano in the Royal Botanical Garden of Madrid
- Born: 4 October 1776; Encinacorba, Spanish Empire
- Died: 23 June 1839 (aged 62); Barcelona, Spanish Empire
- Occupations: botanist, doctor, writer
- Known for: improvement of the Real Jardín Botánico de Madrid (Royal Botanical Garden of Madrid)
- Scientific career
- Author abbrev. (botany): Lag.

Mariano Lagasca y Segura (1776–1839), also known as Mariano la Gasca, was a Spanish botanist, writer and doctor. He was the director of the Real Jardín Botánico de Madrid (Royal Botanical Garden of Madrid).

== Early life ==
Mariano Lagasca y Segura was born in Encinacorba, Province of Zaragoza, in Spain on 4 October 1776 to a wealthy Catholic family. He studied at the local elementary school and, afterwards, he continued his ecclesiastical studies in Tarragona. During his studies in Tarragona, he developed an interest for medicine and botany. After finishing his studies in Tarragona, he started travelling until eventually studying medicine at first in Zaragoza, and later in Valencia and Madrid.

== Career ==
In 1800, he moved to Madrid where he met Antonio José Cavanilles, a well-known botanist and doctor and became his disciple. In Madrid, he cooperated in various fields José Demetrio Rodriguez, and co-published with him a botanical book titled Description of certain plants of the Royal Botanical Garden of Madrid (Spanish: Descripción de algunas plantas del Real Jardín Botánico de Madrid) in 1801.

In 1802, he co-published with Simón de Rojas Clemente y Rubio a volume of articles regarding medicine and botany. After the death of José Cavanilles in 1807, he was appointed to the position of the vice-director of the Royal Botanical Garden of Madrid. During that period, he was also working as a professor of Botany at the university of Madrid.

In 1815, after the Peninsular War, he was appointed to the position of the director of the Royal Botanical Garden of Madrid.

In 1816, he published Genera et species plantarum, quae aut novae sunt aut nondum recte cognoscuntur, which contained 364 names of plants.

In the following years, he would become well known in Spain, because of his work at that position. In 1823, he was exiled from Spain because of his liberal political views. He spent the following eleven years in London, until his return to Spain in 1834 where he regained his position as a director of the Royal Botanical Garden of Madrid. He died five years later, on 23 June 1839, in Barcelona. In 1834 he was said to be in Jersey for two years, where he became an honorary member of the Horticultural Society, and introduced two new species of orchid to the island.

In 1827, he edited and printed his herbarium work Hortus siccus Londinensis; or a collection of dried specimens of plants, growing wild within twenty miles round London, named on the authority of the Banksian herbarium, and other original collections which might be an exsiccata-like series with duplicate specimens.

== See also ==
- Taxa named by Mariano Lagasca
