= Salillas de Jalón =

Coordinates: 41°34′N 1°19′W

Salillas de Jalón, Spain
- Flag Coat of arms
- Interactive map of Salillas de Jalón, Spain
- Country: Spain
- Autonomous community: Aragon
- Province: Zaragoza
- Municipality: Salillas de Jalón

Area
  - Total: 2 km^{2} (0.77 sq mi)

Population (2025-01-01)
  - Total: 372
  - Density: 190/km^{2} (480/sq mi)
- Time zone: UTC+1 (CET)
  - Summer (DST): UTC+2 (CEST)

Salillas de Jalón is a municipality located in the province of Zaragoza, Aragon, Spain. According to the 2004 census (INE), the municipality has a population of 344 inhabitants. It belongs to the county of Valdejalón.

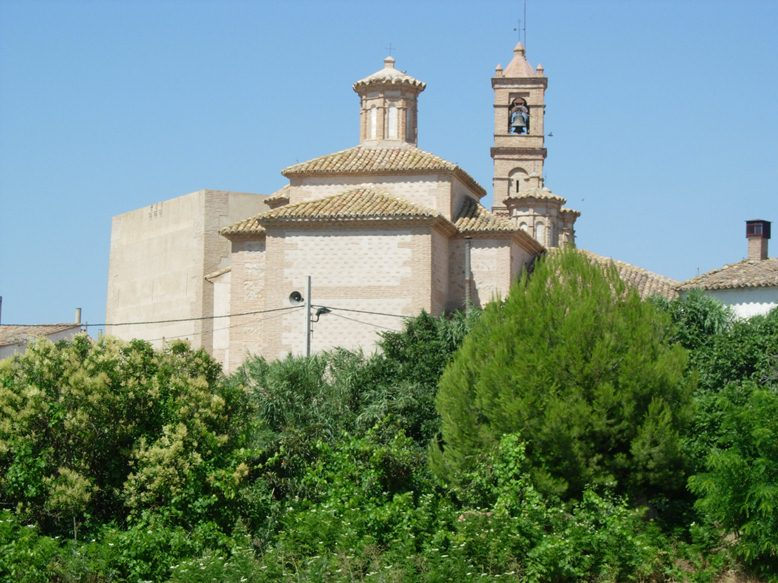
Parish of San Martín in Salillas de Jalón

== See also ==
- List of municipalities in Zaragoza
