= Lumpiaque =

Lumpiaque, Spain
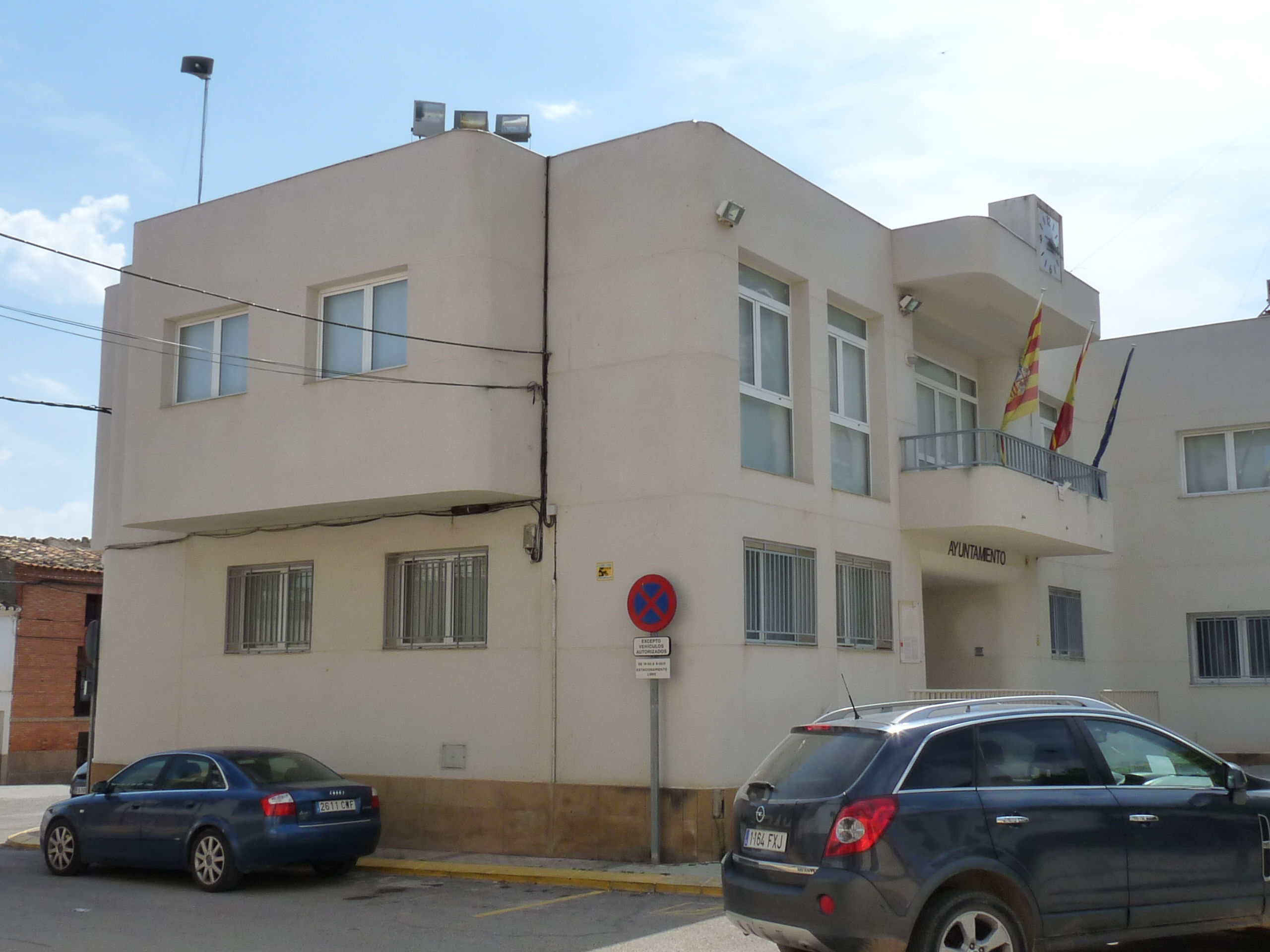

- Coat of arms
- Interactive map of Lumpiaque, Spain
- Coordinates: 41°38′N 1°18′W
- Country: Spain
- Autonomous community: Aragon
- Province: Zaragoza
- Comarca: Valdejalón

Area
  - Total: 29 km^{2} (11 sq mi)

Population (2025-01-01)
  - Total: 889
  - Density: 31/km^{2} (79/sq mi)
- Time zone: UTC+1 (CET)
  - Summer (DST): UTC+2 (CEST)

Lumpiaque is a municipality located in the province of Zaragoza, Aragon, Spain. According to the 2004 census (INE), the municipality has a population of 900 inhabitants.

== See also ==
- List of municipalities in Zaragoza
