= Cariñena DOP =

Spanish wine producing area

Coordinates: 41°20′N 1°13′W

- Wine region
- Cariñena DOP in the province of Zaragoza in the region of Aragon
- Official name: D.O.P Cariñena
- Type: Denominación de Origen Protegida (DOP)
- Year established: 1932
- Country: Spain
- No. of vineyards: 13,768 hectares (34,021 acres)
- No. of wineries: 32
- Wine produced: 642,055 hectolitres
- Comments: Data for 2016 / 2017

The 4 DOP wine regions in the region of Aragon, (Spain)

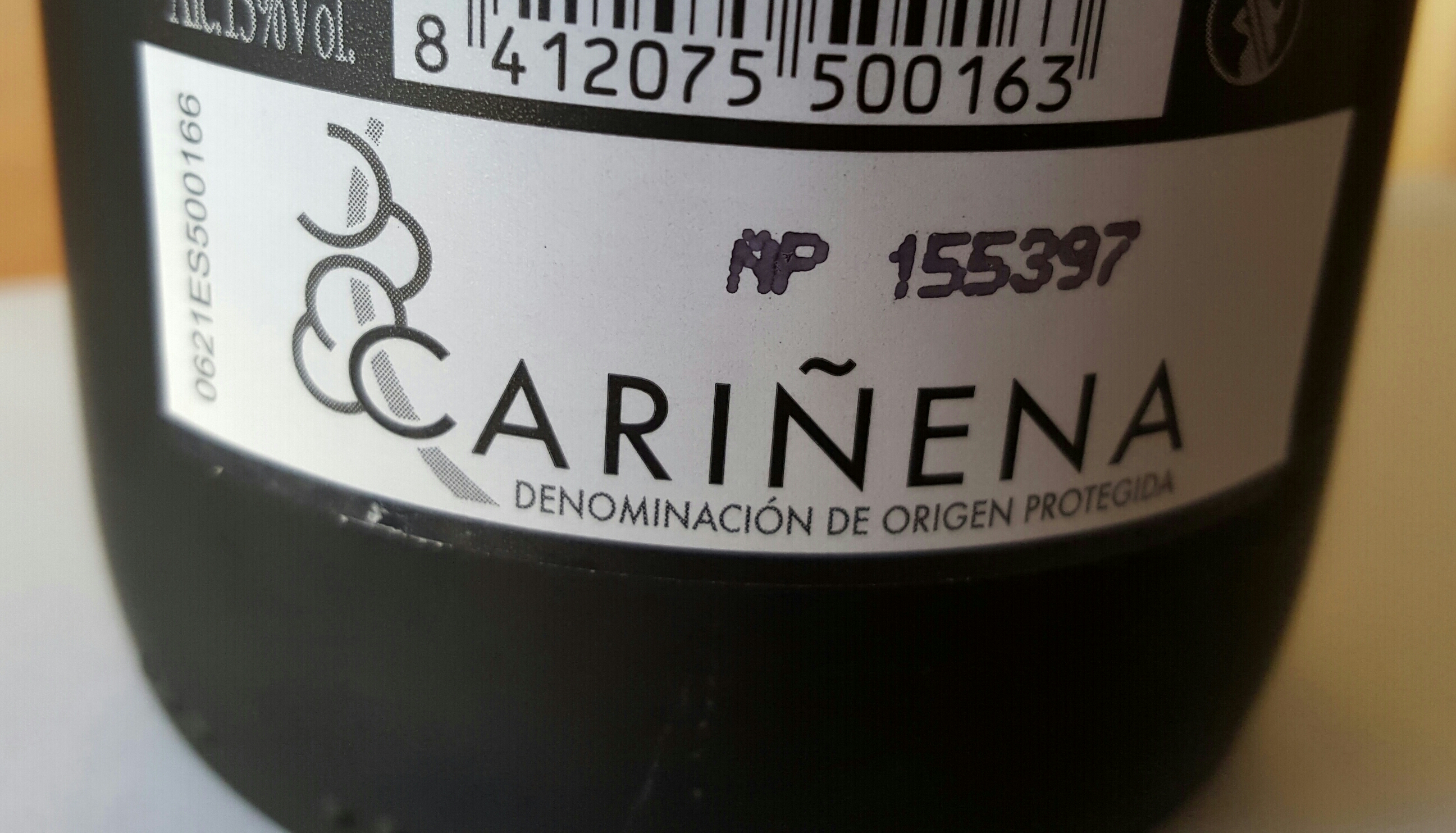
Official DO label as found on the back of a Cariñena region wine bottle

Cariñena is a Spanish Denominación de Origen Protegida (DOP) for wines located in Cariñena in the province of Zaragoza (Aragón, Spain). It is among the oldest protected growing areas in Europe, the DO having been created in 1932 alongside other Spanish wine regions. Cariñena vineyards are located near the centre of Aragón, about 50 km southwest of Zaragoza, on the Campo de Cariñena plateau. The lower vineyards lie at an altitude of 400 m, rising to 800 m as they approach the Sierra de la Virgen mountains. To the west they border on the Calatayud (DO).

The 1990s was a period of rapid development due partly to the numerous mergers of small wineries and cooperatives, and to the adaptation of the wines produced to a more modern palate. The traditional robust, high alcohol content wines are still produced for local consumption, but now fruitier, lighter and well balanced wines are also produced in response to the tastes and preferences of the average export consumer. Exports have quadrupled since 1995 and a new research centre is helping to improve production.

The region is the acknowledged source of the Cariñena / Carignan grape, which is also grown in France, Italy, California, and several other New World regions. The grape is still widely grown in Cariñena, and its official Spanish name is now Mazuelo.

== History ==
The ancient Romans founded the city of Carae in the year 50 BC in an area where the local population had been producing mead since the 3rd century BC. During the Middle Ages grape-growing and wine-making prospered under the protection of several monasteries, and by the 16th century vineyards covered 50% of the territory of the province of Zaragoza.

== Climate ==
The climate is continental (long, hot summers, cold winters) with extremes of temperature over the course of the year: 38 °C in summer and -8 °C in winter. The “cierzo” a cold northerly wind, helps to keep the humidity low. The main problems for the grape-growers are the risk of hailstones, the strong winds and excessive summer heat, as drought can affect the harvest. However the large difference between daytime and night-time temperatures is a positive contributory factor to the characteristic intensity of Cariñena wines.

== Soil ==
The soils are mostly poor, and are brown-limestone or reddish brown limestone over a subsoil of gravels from the Sistema Ibérico mountain range, or brown soils from alluvial deposits.

== Authorised Grape varieties ==
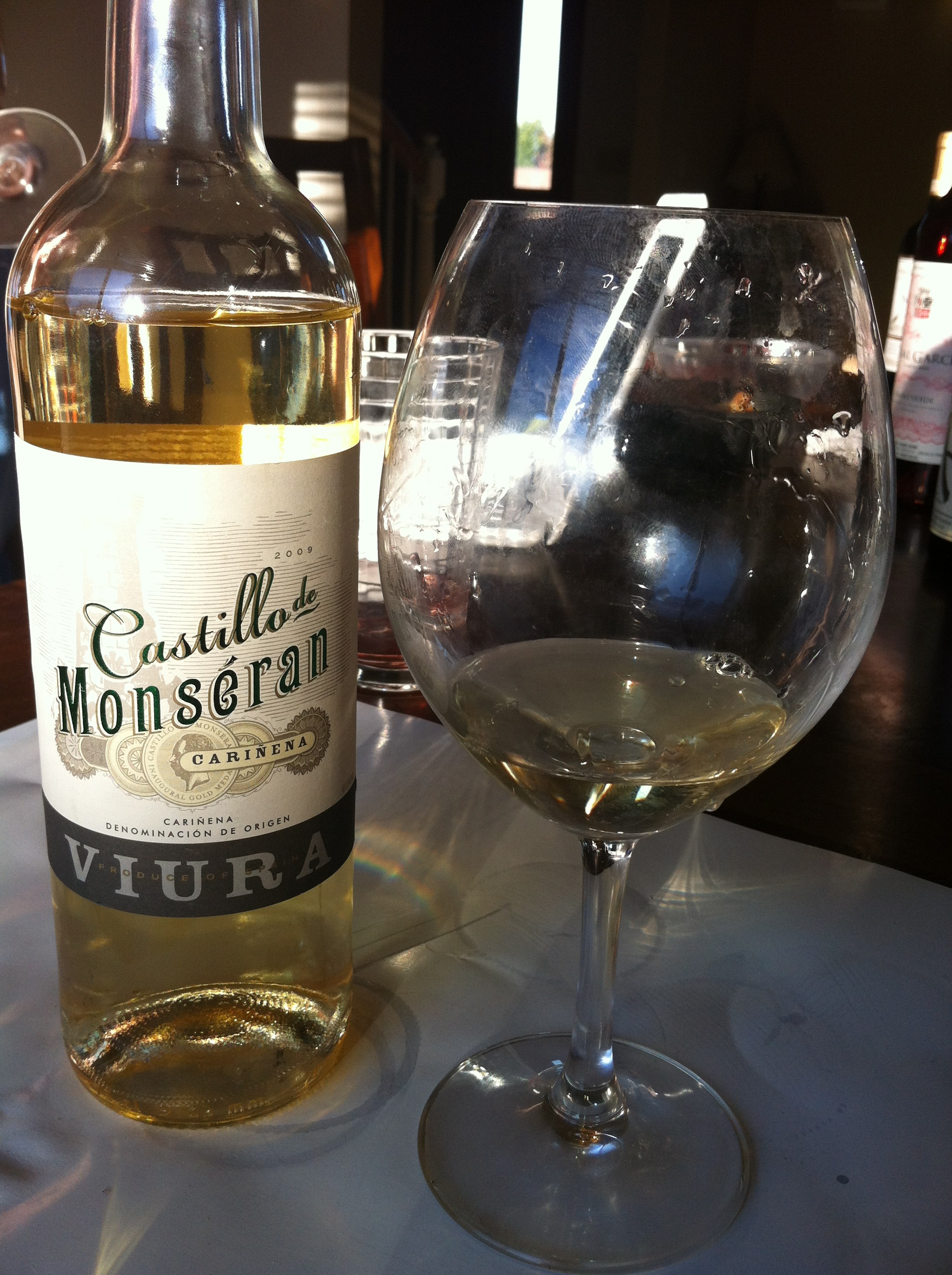
A Viura from the Cariñena region.

- Red: Cabernet Sauvignon, Garnacha Tinta, Juan Ibáñez, Mazuela, Monastrell, Tempranillo, and Vidadillo
- White: Chardonnay, Garnacha Blanc, Macabeo, Moscatel de Alejandría, and Parellada

Most vines are planted on trellises (en espaldera) in marco real layout with 3 m between rows and a planting density of between 1500 and 3000 vines/ha. The harvest generally starts in September.

== Wine production ==
Red wines are produced ensuring that malolactic fermentation has been completed, though carbonic maceration is also used for young wines. Selection for Crianza, Reserva and Gran Reserva starts in the vineyards. Tempranillo is blended with Garnacha to make the Crianza. The whites are made with Viura and the rosés use Garnacha along with other white and red varieties. The rosés do not undergo malolactic fermentation, so as to conserve all their acidity, and are macerated for colour.

Both the fresh young whites and rosé wines produced in Cariñena are best consumed within the year of production. Reds have the characteristic style of Garnacha wines produced in hot climates and, in the case of oak-aged Crianzas, have the taste and strength provided by 5% of Cariñena (Carignan) grapes. Dry whites represent 20% of total production. Sweet Moscatels, for which the region has long been famous, are still produced in quantity from the Moscatel Romano grape.
