= Muel, Zaragoza =

Muel
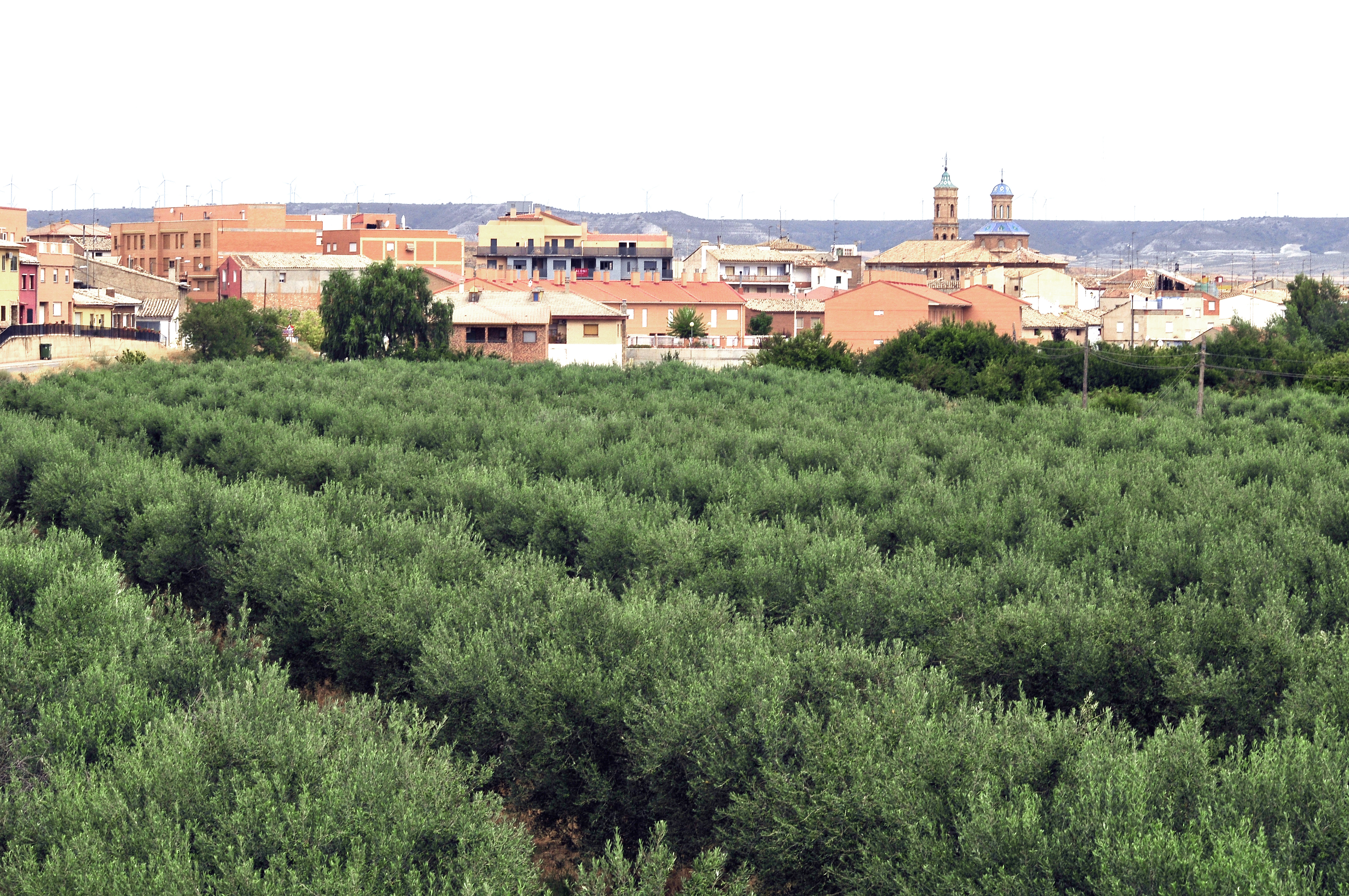

- Flag Coat of arms

- Location within Aragon Location within Spain Location within Europe
- Country: Spain
- Autonomous community: Aragon
- Province: Zaragoza
- Comarca: Campo de Cariñena

Area
  - Total: 79 km^{2} (31 sq mi)

Population (2025-01-01)
  - Total: 1,540
  - Density: 19/km^{2} (50/sq mi)
- Time zone: UTC+1 (CET)
  - Summer (DST): UTC+2 (CEST)

Muel is a municipality located in the province of Zaragoza, Aragon, Spain. According to the 2004 census (INE), the municipality has a population of 1,142 inhabitants. There are ruins of ancient Iberian settlements located within Muel's municipal term. These are known as Cabezo La Torre I and Cabezo La Torre II.

In the 16th century it was inhabited by Moriscos (baptized descendants of Muslims). The only Old Christians were the priest, the notary and the owner of the tavern-inn. "The rest would rather go in a pilgrimage to Mecca than Santiago de Compostela."

== See also ==
- Campo de Cariñena
- List of municipalities in Zaragoza
