= Sierra de Vicort =

Mountain range in Spain

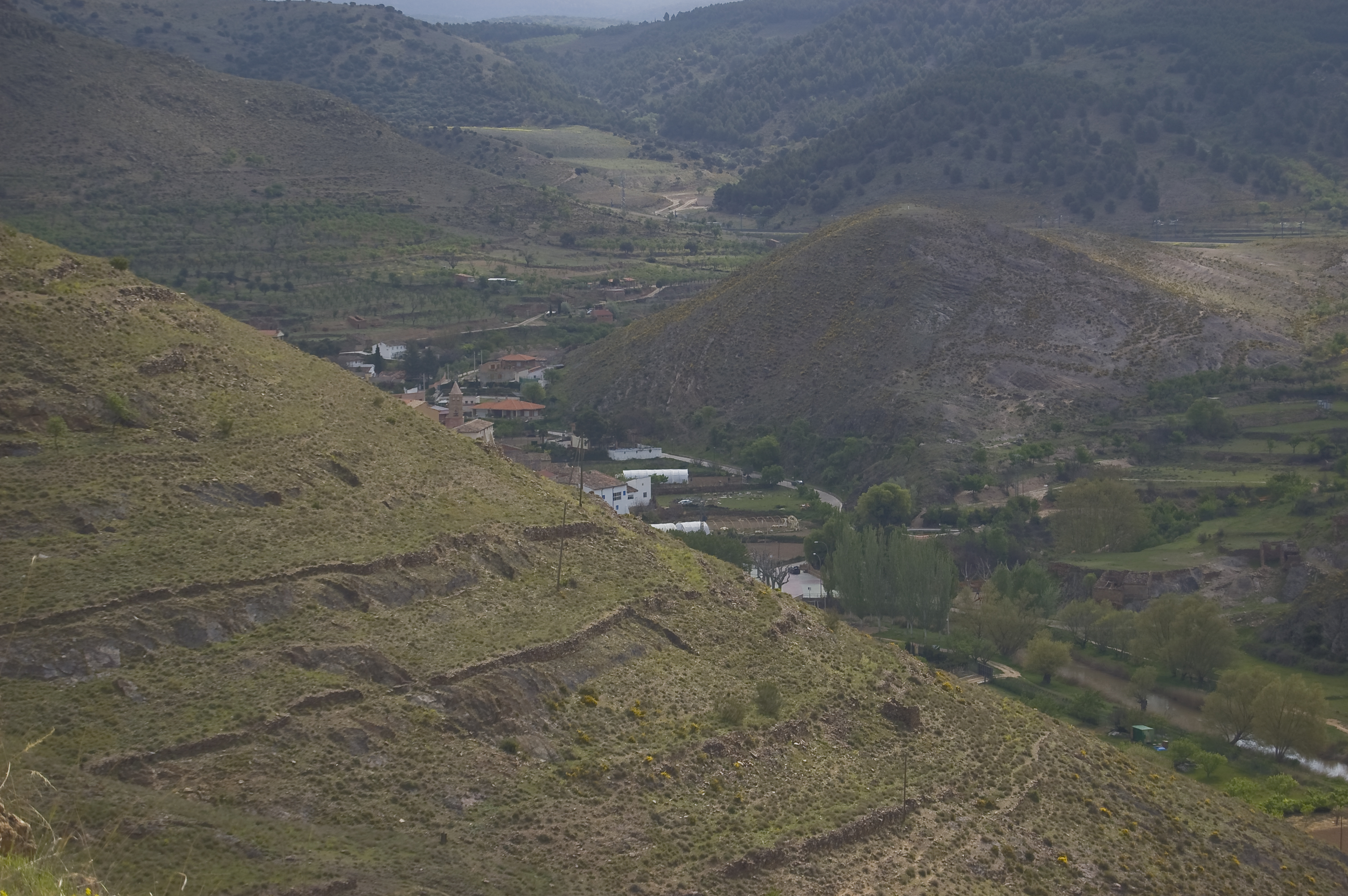
- Sierra de Vicort in Huérmeda

Highest point
- Peak: Pico del Rayo
- Elevation: 1,420 m (4,660 ft)
- Listing: List of mountains in Aragon
- Coordinates: 41°20′24″N 01°27′18″W

Geography
- Location within Spain
- Location: Comunidad de Calatayud, Campo de Daroca (Aragon)
- Parent range: Iberian System

Geology
- Orogeny: Alpine orogeny
- Rock age: Paleozoic
- Rock type: Quartzite

Climbing
- First ascent: Unknown
- Easiest route: Drive from El Frasno, Sediles, Mara, Tobed or Santa Cruz de Grío

Sierra de Vicort, also known as Sierra de Vicor (Aragonese: Sierra de Bicort), is a 20 km (12 mi) long mountain range in the Comunidad de Calatayud and Campo de Daroca comarcas of Aragon, Spain.

The ridge is aligned in a NW-SE direction. It stretches southeast of the Sierra de la Virgen in the same direction roughly between Paracuellos de la Ribera and Codos. It is separated from Sierra de la Virgen by the Jalón River valley. Sierra de Algairén runs north of Sierra de Vicort with a long tectonic basin between them, the Grio River Valley, a tributary of the Jalón having its source in Sierra de Vicort.

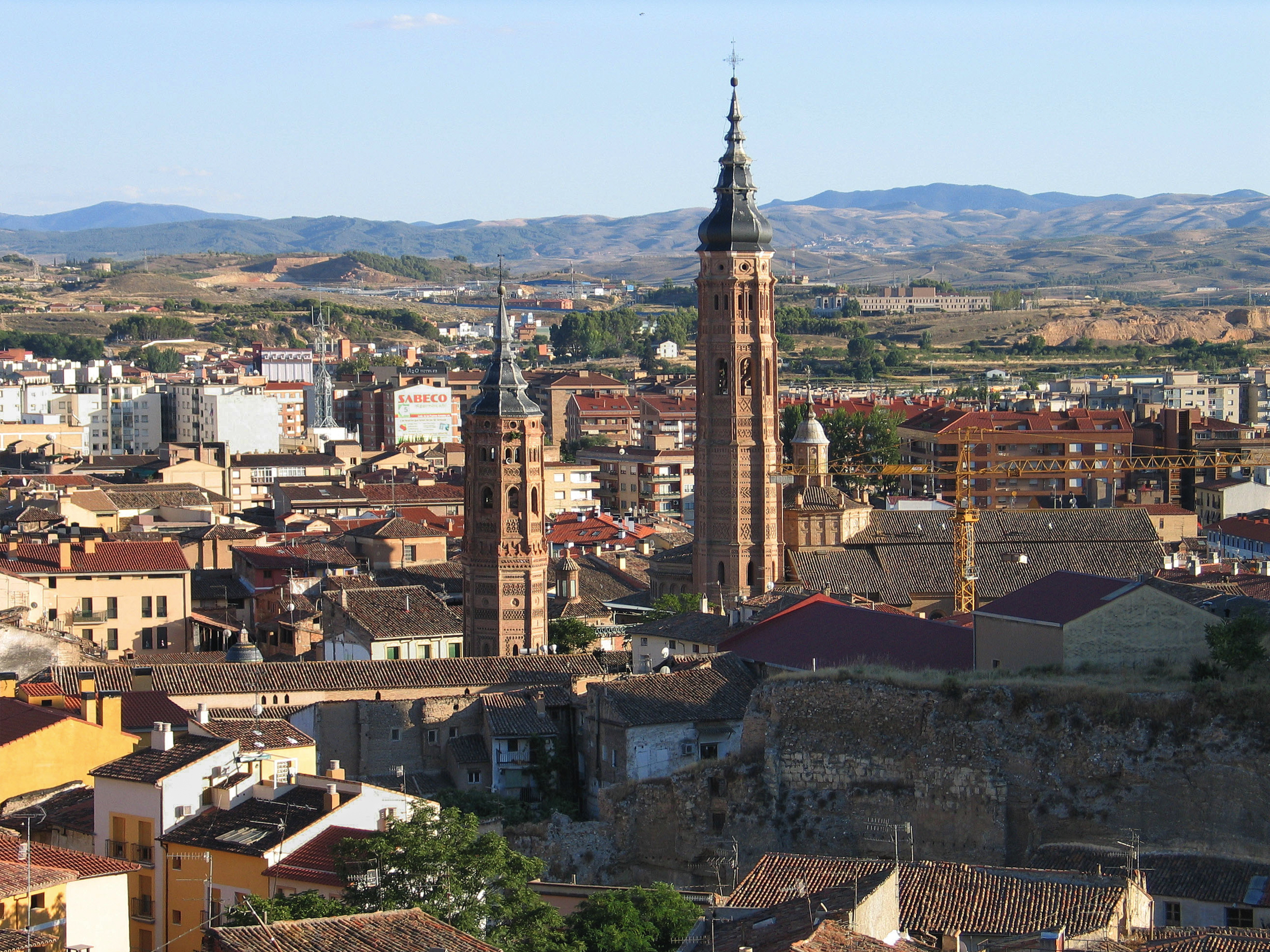
The Sierra de Vicort rising northeast of Calatayud

Sierra de Vicort's highest point is Pico del Rayo (1,420 m). The range forks into two subranges towards its southeastern end, Sierra del Espigar, highest point 1,277 m and Sierra de la Modorra, highest point 1,279 m. The northeastern side of the range is abrupt, while its southwestern flanks, descending towards the Sediles and Mara plateaux are much smoother.

Highway Carretera Nacional N-II crosses the northern end of the range, near El Frasno. There are ancient Celtiberian archaeological remains in and around the range. Some authors claim that the name "Vicort" itself is of Celtiberian origin.

== Flora and human activity ==
These mountains have many forested patches, consisting mainly of pine and Quercus rotundifolia, Quercus pyrenaica and Quercus faginea oaks with heath and broom and Calluna vulgaris shrub, as well as thyme and Festuca grassland in between. Centaurea pinnata is an endangered species of plant present in this mountain range. The southern slopes of Sierra de Vicort are often subject to wildfires in periods of prolonged drought.

Traditional cattle rearing activities still survive on dry grasslands in certain villages around the range. There are also a number of hunters visiting Sierra de Vicort, especially on weekends. The largely ruined ghost town of Aldehuela de Santa Cruz and almost uninhabited Viver de Vicort are located in this range.

On 1,411 m high Pico de Santa Brígida there is a weather radar antenna, part of the Inogés military base. There is also a Virgin Mary shrine located in the heights of the mountain range, the sanctuary known as Ermita de Nuestra Señora de Jerusalen.

== See also ==
- Sistema Ibérico
- Mountains of Aragon
- Comunidad de Calatayud
