= Tosos =

Coordinates: 41.316°N 1.071°W

- municipality
- Coat of arms
- Interactive map of Tosos
- Country: Spain
- Autonomous community: Aragon
- Province: Zaragoza

Area
  - Total: 68 km^{2} (26 sq mi)

Population (2025-01-01)
  - Total: 176
  - Density: 2.6/km^{2} (6.7/sq mi)
- Time zone: UTC+1 (CET)
  - Summer (DST): UTC+2 (CEST)

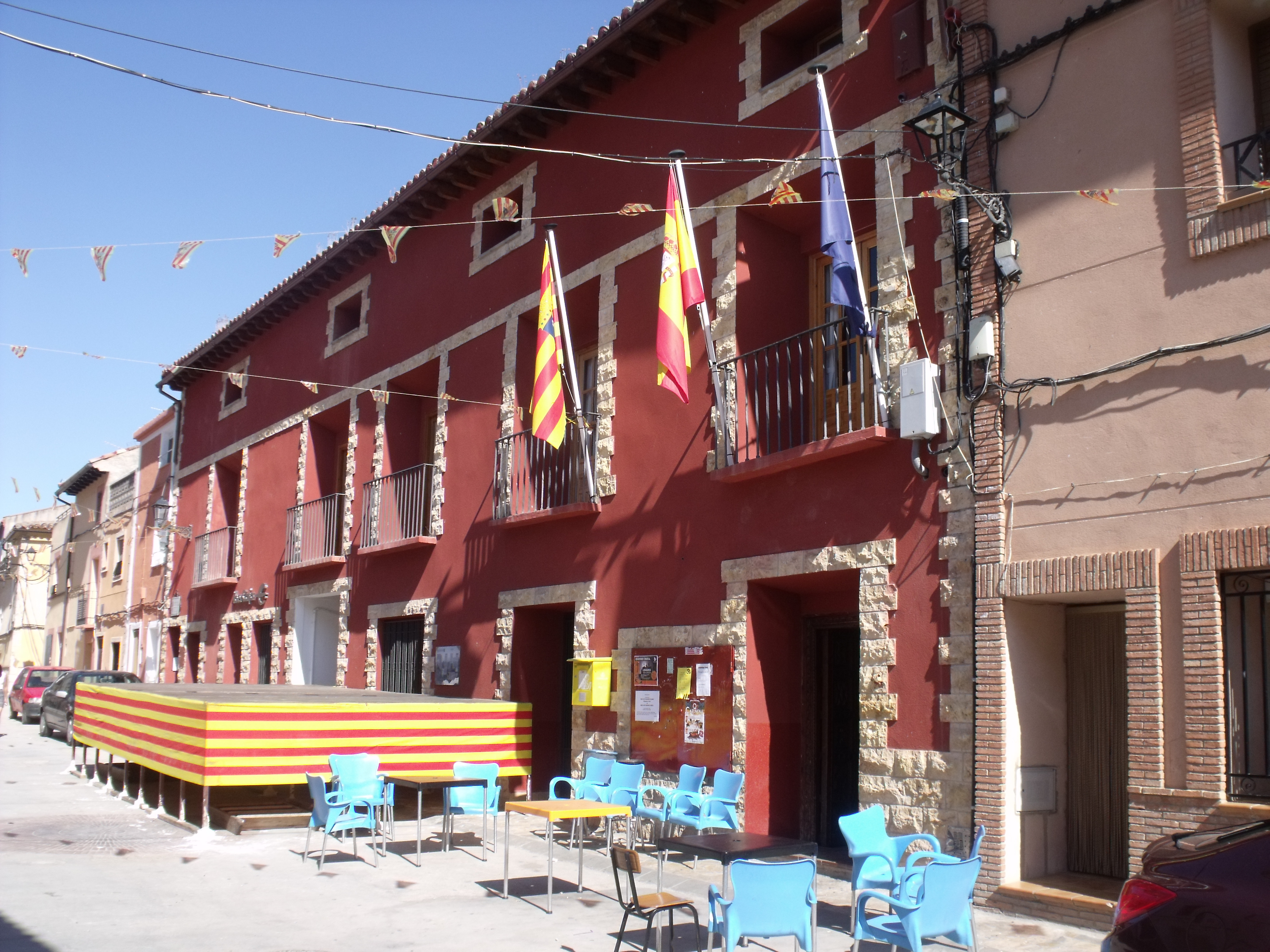
Former palace of the Marquis. It houses the town hall, a civic center, a bank office and other services for the village.

Tosos is a municipality located in the province of Zaragoza, Aragon, Spain. According to the 2004 census (INE), the municipality has a population of 217 inhabitants.

== See also ==
- List of municipalities in Zaragoza
