= Aguilón =

Place in Aragon, Spain

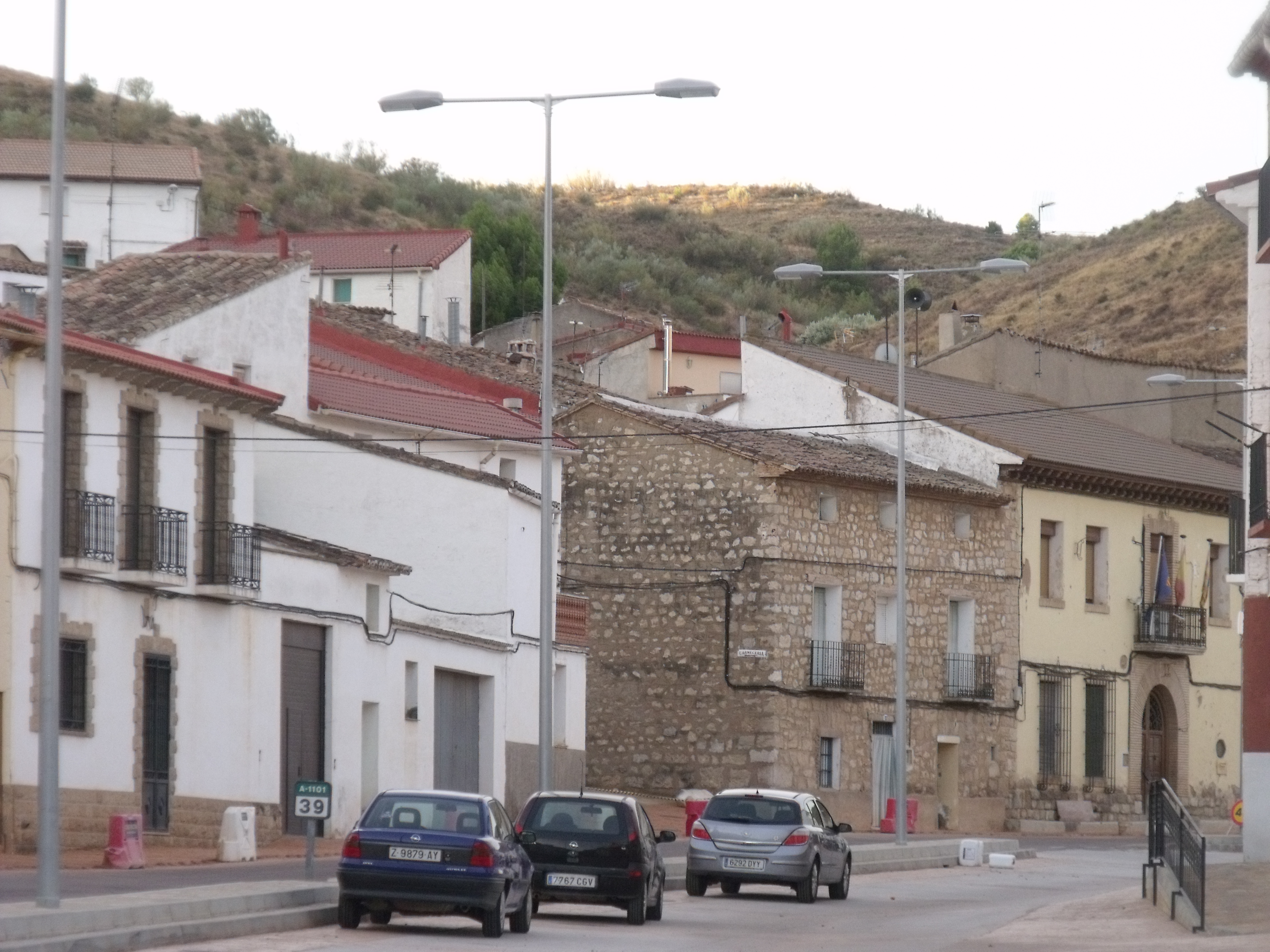

- Flag Coat of arms

- Location within Aragon Location within Spain Location within Europe
- Country: Spain
- Autonomous community: Aragon
- Province: Zaragoza
- Municipality: Aguilón

Area
  - Total: 59 km^{2} (23 sq mi)

Population (2025-01-01)
  - Total: 265
  - Density: 4.5/km^{2} (12/sq mi)
- Time zone: UTC+1 (CET)
  - Summer (DST): UTC+2 (CEST)

Aguilón is a municipality located in the province of Zaragoza, Aragon, Spain. According to the 2004 census (INE), the municipality has a population of 290 inhabitants.

There are ruins of ancient Iberian settlements located within Aguilón's municipal term. These are known as Cerro de San Pablo de Villanueva and Peña Foradada.

== See also ==
- Campo de Cariñena
- List of municipalities in Zaragoza
