= Longares =

- municipality
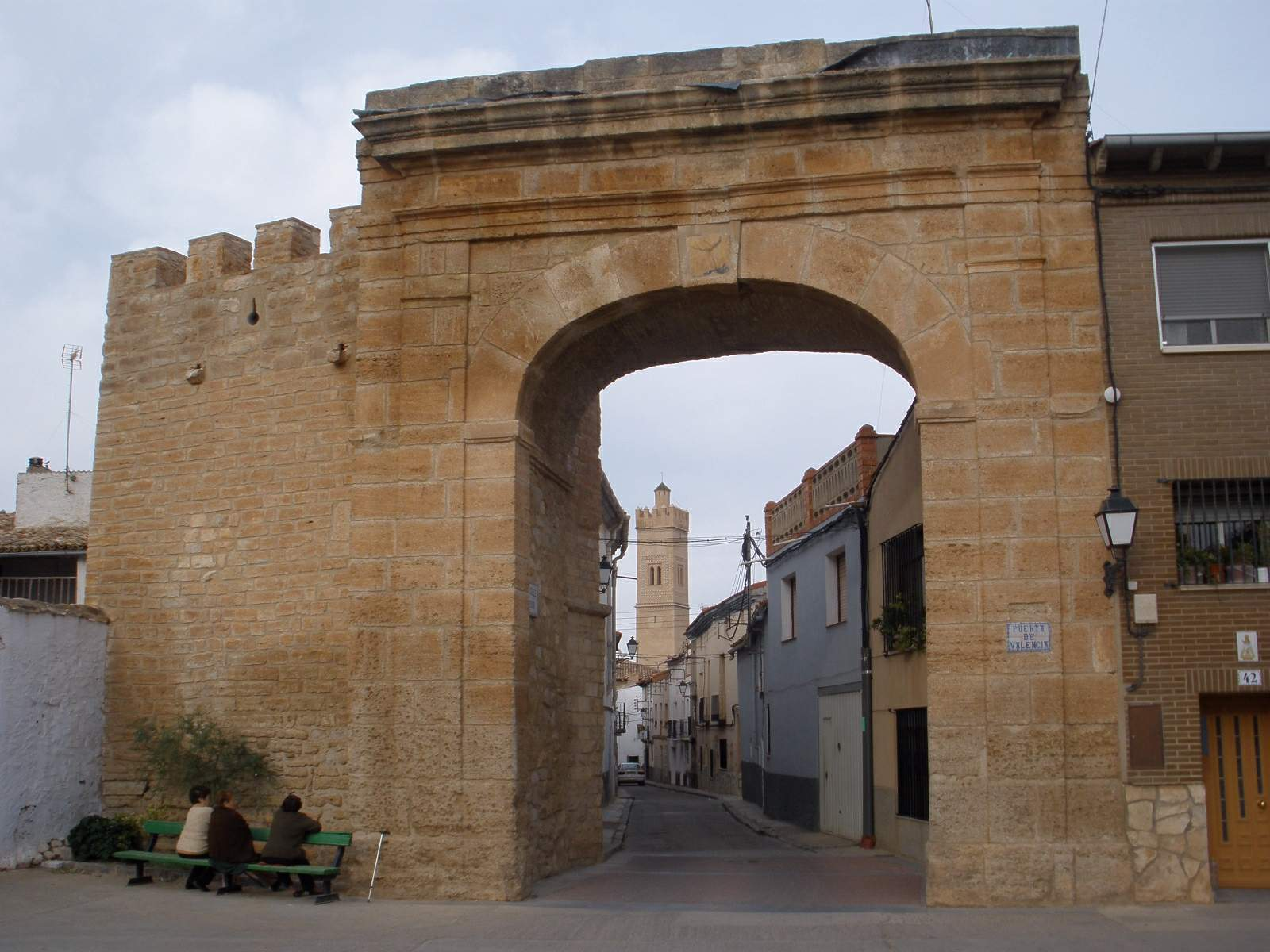

- Coat of arms

- Location within Aragon Location within Spain Location within Europe
- Coordinates: 41°24′N 1°11′W
- Country: Spain
- Autonomous community: Aragon
- Province: Zaragoza

Government
  - Mayor: Miguel Jaime Angos (CHA)

Area
  - Total: 45.7 km^{2} (17.6 sq mi)
- Elevation: 531 m (1,742 ft)

Population (2025-01-01)
  - Total: 802
  - Density: 17.5/km^{2} (45.5/sq mi)
- Time zone: UTC+1 (CET)
  - Summer (DST): UTC+2 (CEST)
- Postal Code: 50460
- Area Code: (+34) 976
- Website: www.longares.com

Longares is a municipality located in the province of Zaragoza, Aragon, Spain. According to the 2004 census (INE), the municipality has a population of 906 inhabitants.

The Cabezo de Altomira hill, a conspicuous landmark in the flat landscape, can be seen NW of the town.

== See also ==
- List of municipalities in Zaragoza
