= Campo de Cariñena =

- Comarca

- Flag Coat of arms
- Interactive map of Campo de Cariñena
- Coordinates: 41°22′N 1°18′W
- Country: Spain
- Autonomous community: Aragon
- Province: Zaragoza
- Capital: Cariñena
- Municipalities: List: Aguarón, Aguilón, Aladrén, Alfamén, Cariñena, Cosuenda, Encinacorba, Longares, Mezalocha, Muel, Paniza, Tosos, Villanueva de Huerva and Vistabella de Huerva

Area
  - Total: 772 km^{2} (298 sq mi)

Population
  - Total: 10,987
  - Density: 14.2/km^{2} (36.9/sq mi)
- Time zone: UTC+1 (CET)
  - Summer (DST): UTC+2 (CEST)
- Largest municipality: Cariñena

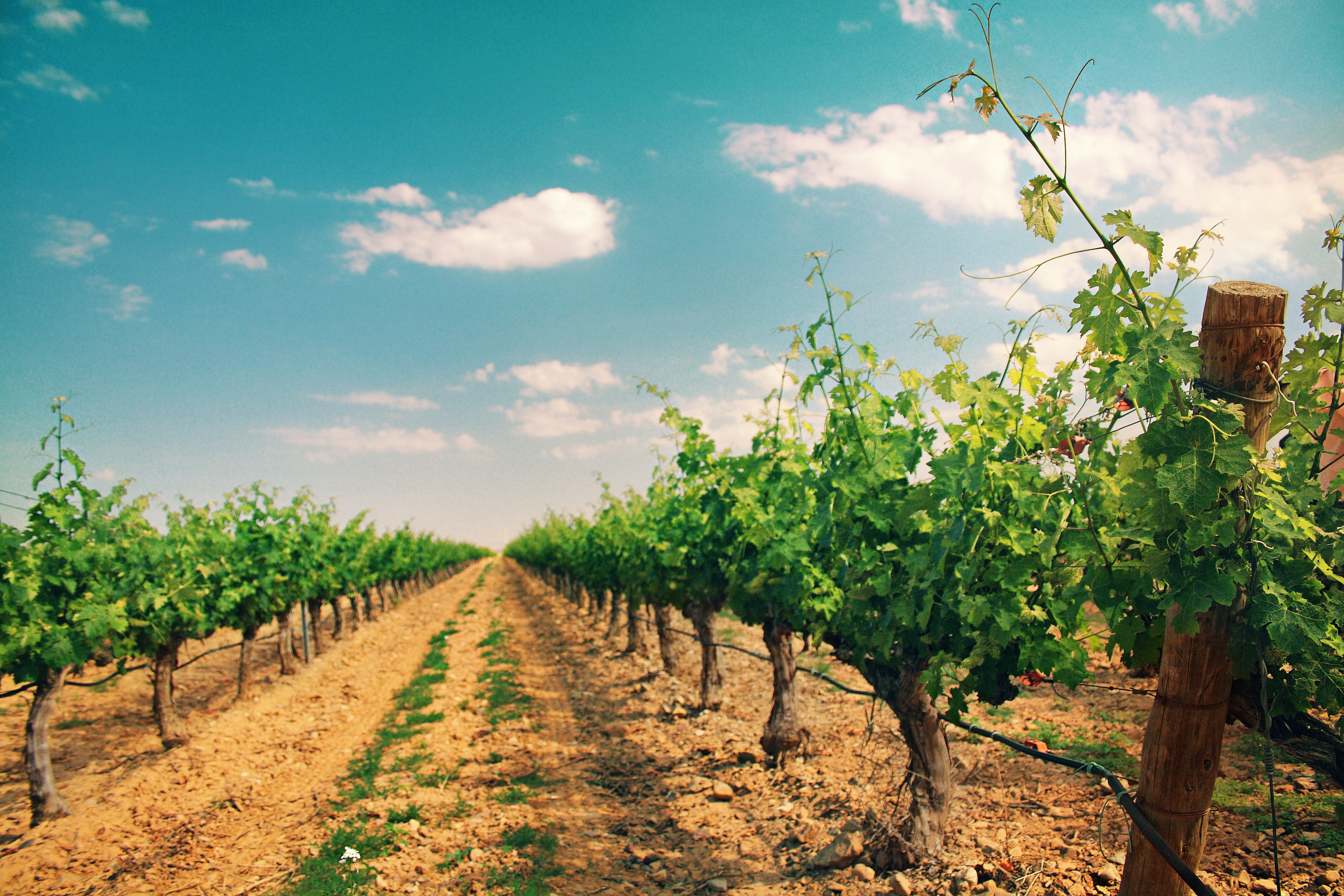
Vineyard in the Campo de Cariñena

Campo de Cariñena is a comarca in central Aragon, Spain. It is located in the province of Zaragoza, in the transitional area between the Iberian System and the Ebro Valley. The most important town is Cariñena.

It is a traditional wine-producing region located between rivers Jalón and Huerva. There are about 15,705 hectares of vineyards in this region. This comarca has a dry, continental climate, with marked seasonal changes, the summers are hot and relatively short compared with the long cold winters.

== See also ==
- Cariñena (DO)
- Comarcas of Aragon
