= Cariñena, Aragon =

Cariñena
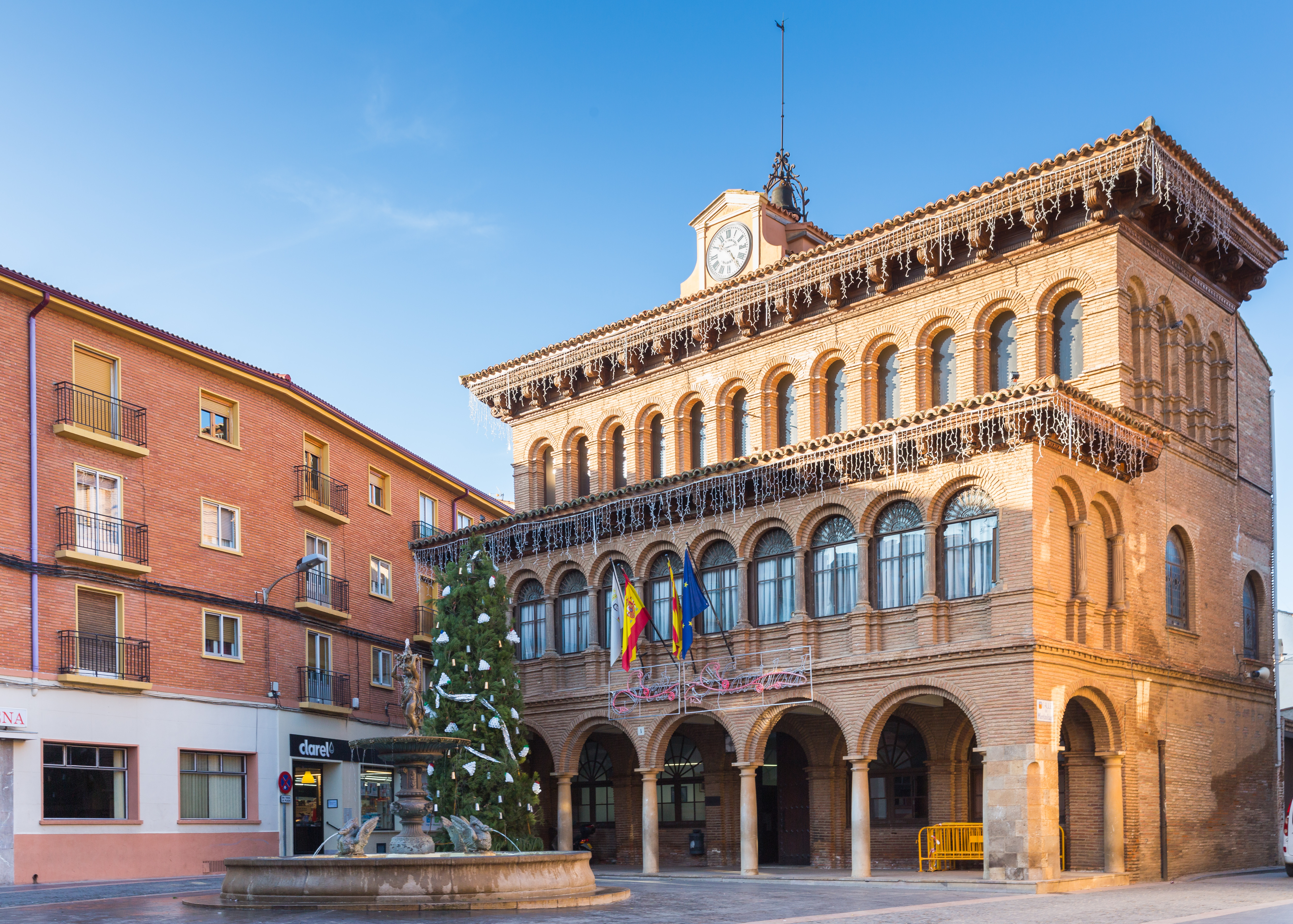
- Cariñena town hall

- Coat of arms

- Location within Aragon Location within Spain Location within Europe
- Coordinates: 41°20′N 1°13′W
- Country: Spain
- Autonomous community: Aragon
- Province: Zaragoza

Government
  - Mayor: Sergio Ortiz Gutiérrez (PSOE)

Area
  - Total: 82.5 km^{2} (31.9 sq mi)
- Elevation: 591 m (1,939 ft)

Population (2025-01-01)
  - Total: 3,530
  - Density: 42.8/km^{2} (111/sq mi)

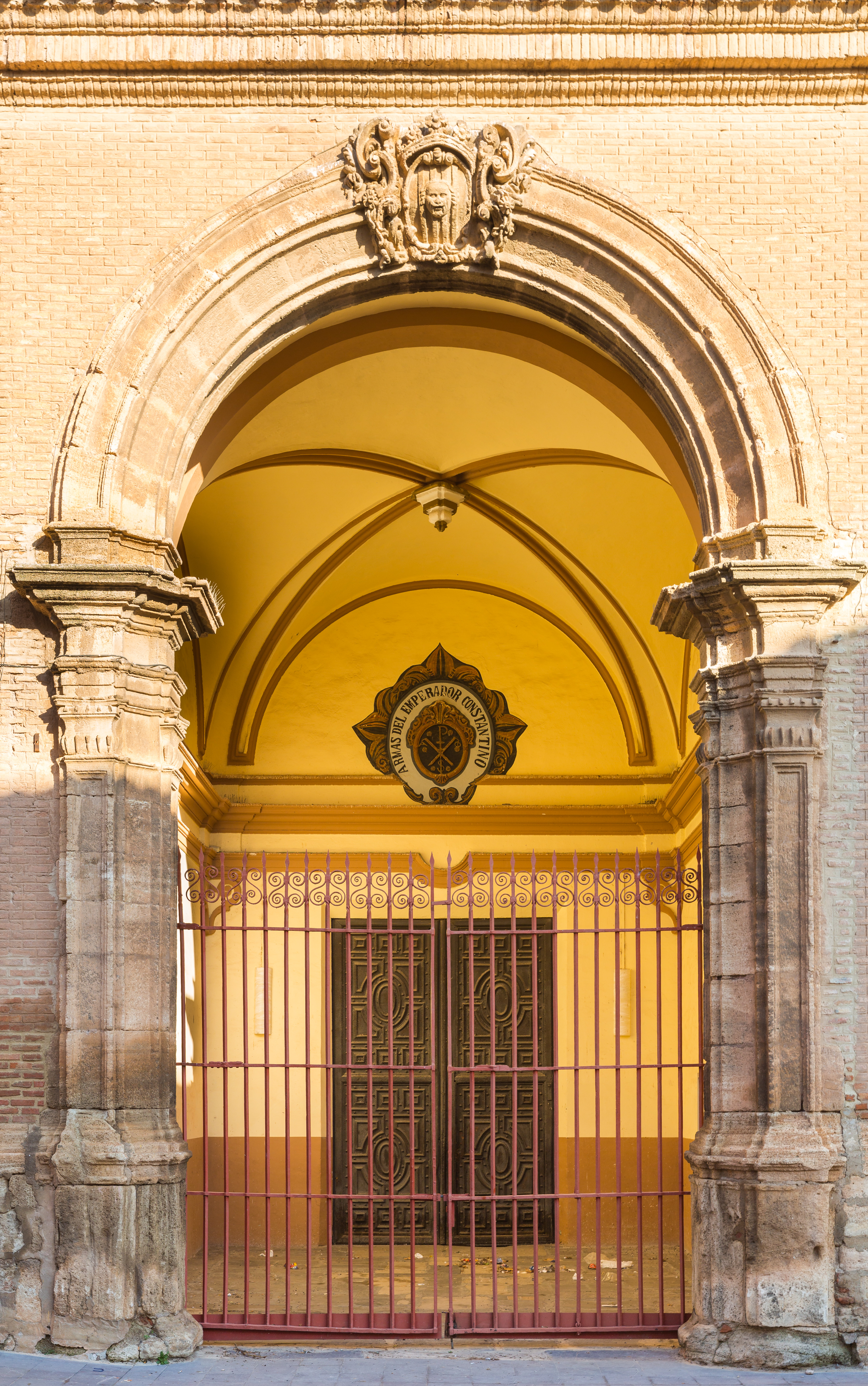
Entrance to the church of the Assumption

Cariñena is a village in the province of Zaragoza, in the autonomous community of Aragon, Spain. It is the capital of the comarca Campo de Cariñena. It is known for its wine and the Cariñena grape, to which it gave its name. In ancient Roman times it was known as Carae and it was recorded that in the 3rd century BC its inhabitants drank wine mixed with honey.

== History ==
The name Cariñena dates back to the Roman era. Pliny the Elder, the procurator of Tarraconensis, named this Roman settlement Carae; the suffix -iniana (thus Cariniana) was characteristic of many Roman manors.

The village Cariniana signified the hamlet and manor situated in the location of Carae and refers to its owner, Carinius. At the end of the second century, a tendency to concentrate the property led to the appearance of the large latifundia whose owners gave their names to places like this. Afterwards, in the Middle Ages, the name followed sound rules to become its current name.

King Alfonso XIII conferred the title of "city" to Cariñena owing to the quality of its wines.

== European Wine City 2025 ==
Cariñena has been named European Wine City 2025 by RECEVIN.

== See also ==
- Cariñena (DO)
- Campo de Cariñena
- List of municipalities in Zaragoza
