= Sierra de Algairén =

Mountain range in Spain

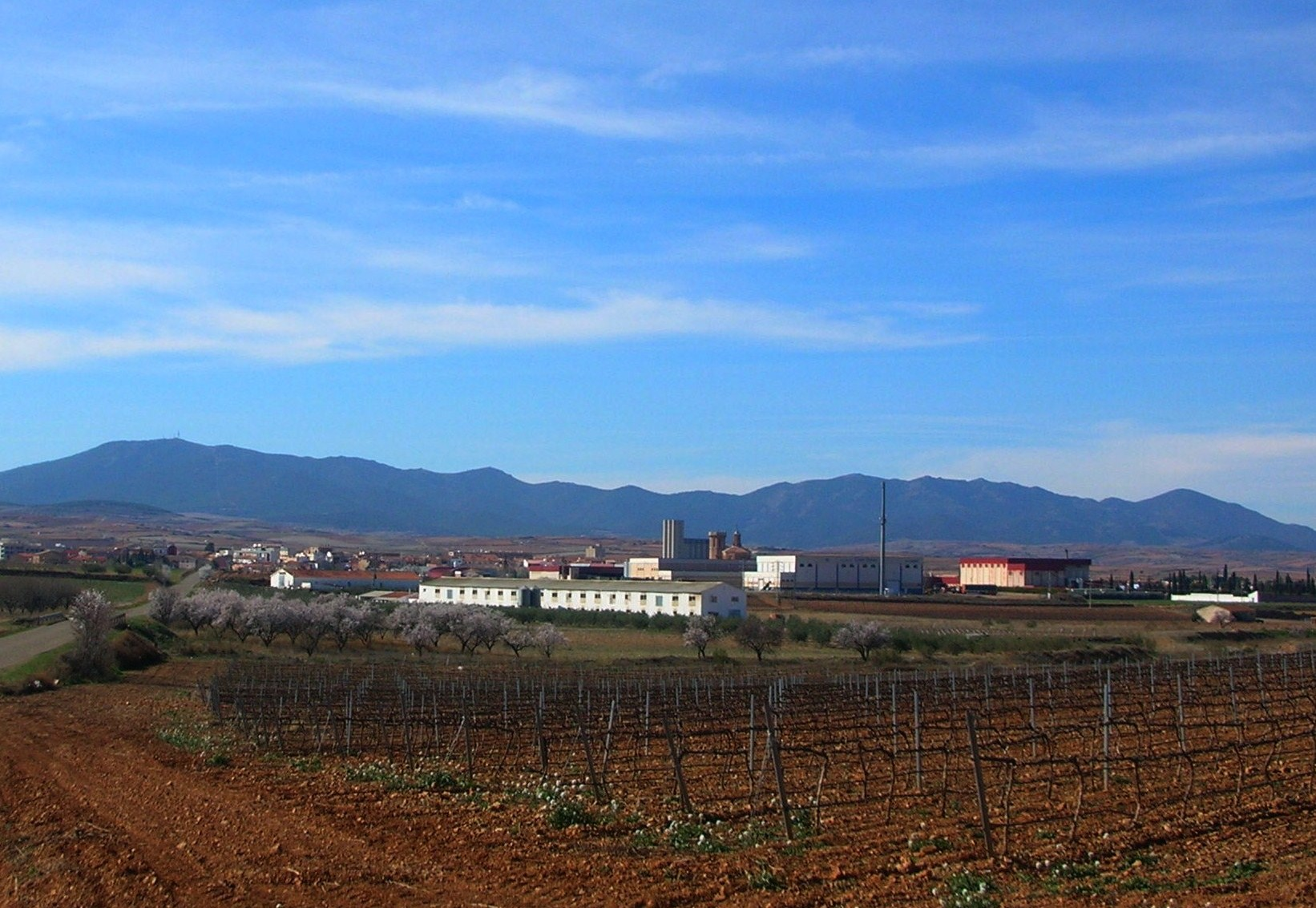
- The Sierra de Algairén behind Cariñena

Highest point
- Peak: Pico de Valdemadera
- Elevation: 1,276 m (4,186 ft)
- Listing: List of mountains in Aragon
- Coordinates: 41°21′23″N 01°22′35″W

Geography
- Location within Spain
- Location: Campo de Cariñena & Comunidad de Calatayud (Aragon)
- Parent range: Iberian System

Geology
- Orogeny: Alpine orogeny
- Rock age: Paleozoic
- Rock type(s): Sandstone and slate

Climbing
- First ascent: Unknown
- Easiest route: Drive from Almonacid de la Sierra, Cosuenda or Tobed

Sierra de Algairén is a mountain range in Aragon, Spain, located between the comarcas of Campo de Cariñena and Comunidad de Calatayud. The ridge's highest summit is Pico de Valdemadera (1,276 m).

== Description ==
The Algairén Mountains are covered with forest made up pine, Carrasca (Quercus ilex), cork oak, and also maple trees. They are a Special Protection Area for birds.

These mountains are part of the central area of the Iberian System and the summits are often covered with snow in the winter.
