= Nivola =

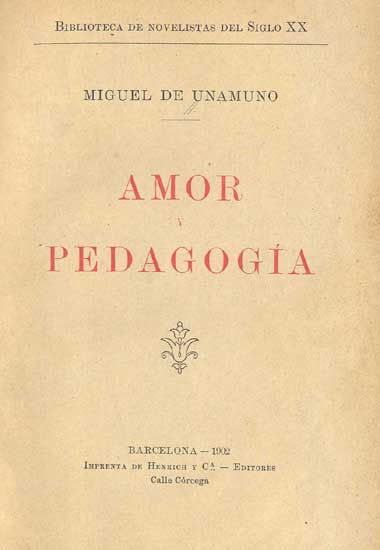
The cover of the first edition of Miguel de Unamuno's 'Nivola'- "Love and Pedagogy", 1902. Henrich & Co.

Nivola is a term created by Miguel de Unamuno to refer to his works that contrasted with the realism prevalent in Spanish novels during the early 20th century. Since his works were not fully novels, or "novelas" in Spanish, Unamuno coined a new word, "nivolas", to describe them.

== Origin of the term nivola ==
The term nivola appears for the first time as a subtitle for Unamuno's book Niebla. With this term, the writer was trying to express his rejection of the dominant principles of realism as expressed in novels: the psychological characterization of the characters, the realistic environments, and the third-person omniscient narrator.

He expresses this in his prologue to Niebla:

He oído también contar de un arquitecto arqueólogo que pretendía derribar una basílica del siglo X, y no restaurarla, sino hacerla de nuevo como debió haber sido hecha y no como se hizo. Conforme a un plano de aquella época que pretendía haber encontrado. Conforme al proyecto del arquitecto del siglo X. ¿Plano? Desconocía que las basílicas se han hecho a sí mismas saltando por encima de los planos, llevando las manos de los edificadores. También de una novela, como de una epopeya o de un drama, se hace un plano; pero luego la novela, la epopeya o el drama se imponen al que se cree su autor. O se le imponen los agonistas, sus supuestas criaturas. Así se impusieron Luzbel y Satanás, primero, y Adán y Eva, después, a Jehová. ¡Y ésta sí que es nivola, u opopeya o trigedia! Así se me impuso Augusto Pérez. Y esta trigedia la vio, cuando apareció esta mi obra, entre sus críticos, Alejandro Plana, mi buen amigo catalán. Los demás se atuvieron, por pereza mental, a mi diabólica invención de la nivola. Esta ocurrencia de llamarle nivola – ocurrencia que en rigor no es mía, como lo cuento en el texto – fue otra ingenua zorrería para intrigar a los críticos. Novela y tan novela como cualquiera otra que así sea. Es decir, que así se llame, pues aquí ser es llamarse. ¿Qué es eso de que ha pasado la época de las novelas? ¿O de los poemas épicos? Mientras vivan las novelas pasadas vivirá y revivirá la novela. La historia es resoñarla.

—Miguel de Unamuno: Niebla, Prologue
Translation:

I've heard about an archaeologist who studied architecture who was wanting to knock down a basilica from the 10th century. He didn't want to restore it, but rather to build it the way it should have been built in the first place. It was based on a plan from that period that he claimed to have found. It conformed to the project of the 10th-century architect. What he didn't realize was that basilicas make themselves, transcending any plans thought out in advance, using the very workers' hands as their tools in self-creation. Such is the novel, like epics or drama. A plan is made, but later the novel, the epic, or the drama imposes itself upon the author's vision. The characters, his supposed creations, impose themselves on him. In this way Lucifer and Satan, and later Adam and Eve, imposed themselves on Jehovah. This is not a novel, but a nivel [standard, level]; not a tragedy, but a trigidy! In this way Augusto Pérez imposed himself on me. And between my critics, my good Catalan friend Alejandro Plana saw this tragedy when this my work appeared. Because of sheer mental laziness, all the others didn't spot this, my diabolical invention: the nivola. This idea, to call it a nivola, which in truth is not truly mine, as I point out in the text – it was another ingenious trick to intrigue the critics. A novel, and as much of a novel as any other. That is to say, that this is its name, therefore to be is to have a name. Who says the age of novels or epic poems has passed? Just as long past novels live, the novel shall live and live again. The story is to redream it.

Niebla is the story of Augusto Pérez, a single man, philosophical and melancholy, who dedicates his time to long walks, and reflection, with his dog Orfeo. Augusto falls in love with Eugenia and idealizes her in a similar way to Don Quijote's idealization of Dulcinea. He dedicates himself to winning her love. The most famous passage of the novel occurs towards the end when the principal character decides to confront the real author, Miguel de Unamuno, to ask for advice about his destiny. The encounter degenerates into a confrontation in which the author decides to kill his character, which leads to the character's death a few pages later.

== Characteristics of the nivolas ==
A nivola has the following characteristics:

- Predominance of ideas over form: Just as in his poetry and plays, Unamuno's nivolas give priority to content over form. In fact, novels like Amor y pedagogía (Love and Pedagogy) approach the genre of a thesis novel (novela de tesis), cultivated by Benito Pérez Galdós or Blasco Ibáñez among others.
- Scarce psychological development of the characters: the characters of the nivolas are often defined by a single personal quality which some see as making them seem somewhat flat, in contrast to the multifaceted characters of realist novels. The characters of Niebla, Amor y Pedagogía or Abel Sánchez are incarnations of an idea or a passion, which impedes them from relating to the world in a normal way.
- Scarce realism in the environment: Except for his first novel Paz en la guerra (Peace in War), and perhaps his last, San Manuel Bueno, mártir (Saint Emmanuel the Good, Martyr), Unamuno's novels hardly describe the place or time in which they develop. In this way they accent their abstract nature.
- Rapid writing process: in contrast to the slow and progressive writing of realist novels, Unamuno's nivolas, according to him, resulted from a hasty birth without a long period of preparation, documentation and planning.

Beyond Niebla, the following works can be classified as nivolas: Abel Sánchez, Amor y pedagogía and La tía Tula (Aunt Tula). Arguably a nivola, San Manuel Bueno, mártir contains greater psychological development and narrative description than the other works, and is generally considered Unamuno's masterpiece.
