= ¡Que inventen ellos! =

Spanish phrase quoted by Miguel de Unamuno

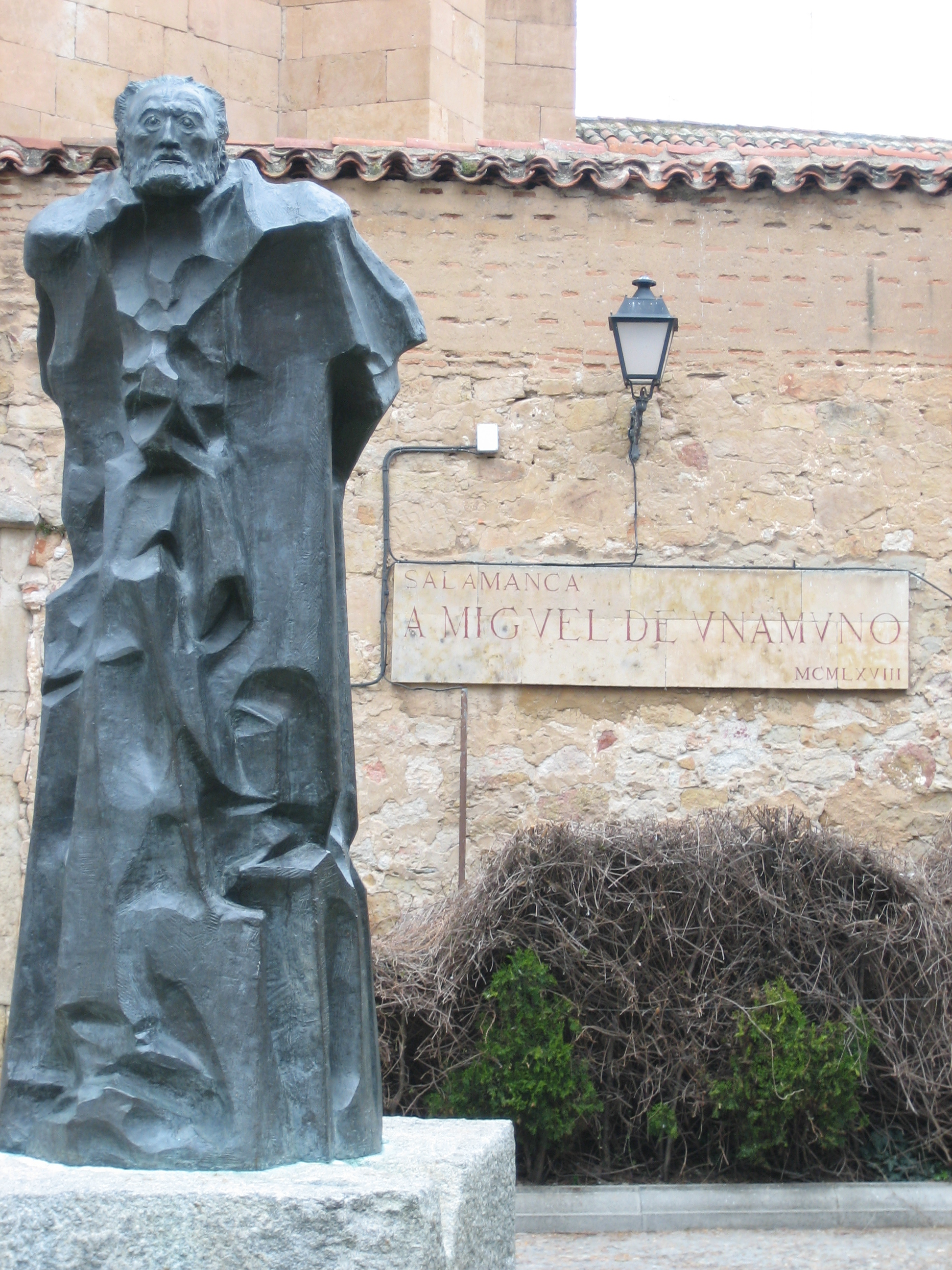
Unamuno in Salamanca (sculpted by Pablo Serrano).

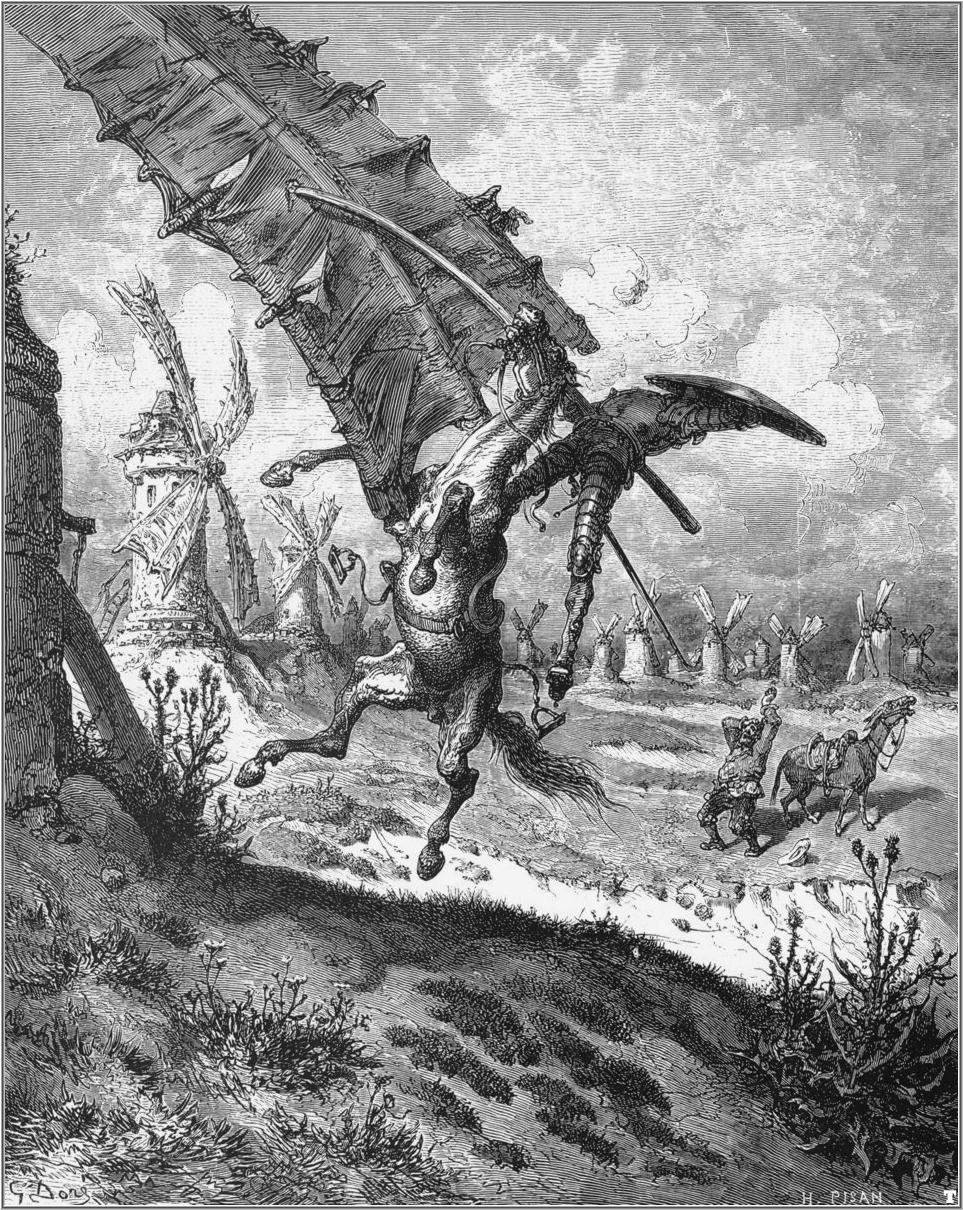
In this engraving of Gustave Doré, Don Quixote fights against the giants while Sancho advertises him that they are windmills; a Cervantine scene interpreted repeatedly as a metaphor of the opposition between the idealism and the materialism (not very in the philosophical sense as in the vulgar of both terms).

¡Que inventen ellos! (English: Let them invent!) is a lapidary quote by Miguel de Unamuno expressing disdain and even contempt for invention, science, and technology. It has become a shorthand for the stereotype of Spanish people being anti-scientific, or for science and technology being a "marginal reality in Spain in its organization and social context". The repeated use of the phrase has produced a motif or cliché, either rejected as offensive to the Spanish national character, or sometimes re-affirmed with pride.

The quote is also paraphrased in a feminist sense, revindicating the work of women in science: ¡Que inventen ellas! (Let [feminine] them invent!).

== History ==
The phrase became controversial through the writings of José Ortega y Gasset, who between 1906 and at least 1912 discussed the issue of the "Europeanization of Spain or the Spanishization of Europe". In this context he gave the idea an increasingly polemical interpretation, describing what he called the "Africanist deviation of the professor and Salamancan morabite", and concluding with the accusation that "Don Miguel de Unamuno, energetic Spaniard, has failed the truth".

Spanish Lo europeo moderno o lo africano antiguo... ¿por qué no ser africano como lo fue San Agustín?	Translation The modern European or the ancient African... Why not be African as Saint Augustine was?

For Unamuno – who in his intellectual maturity reacted against his earlier positivism – modern "European scientific orthodoxy" and what he called a "scientific inquisition" were incompatible with what he described as "Spanish science", which he associated with mysticism and idealism. He wrote that it was preferable to be a religious ancient African than a scientific modern European. "Science removes wisdom from man... the object of science is life and the object of wisdom is death."

The phrase is given a distinct, though related, meaning in a letter from Unamuno to Ortega dated 30 May 1906.

Spanish Yo me voy sintiendo profundamente antieuropeo. ¿Que ellos inventan cosas?, invéntenlas	Translation I am coming to feel profoundly anti-European. Are they inventing things? Let them invent.

The expression appeared again in July of the same year in El pórtico del templo, an article written in the form of a dialogue between two characters:

Spanish

ROMÁN.- Inventen, pues, ellos y nosotros nos aprovecharemos de sus invenciones. Pues confío y espero en que estarás convencido, como yo lo estoy, de que la luz eléctrica alumbra aquí tan bien como allí donde se inventó.

SABINO.- Acaso mejor.

— El pórtico del templo

Translation

ROMÁN: So let them invent, and we will take advantage of their inventions. I trust and hope that you will be convinced, as I am, that electric light illuminates here just as well as where it was invented.

SABINO: Perhaps better.

— El pórtico del templo

Ortega later declared that he intended to launch a polemic against what he saw as Unamuno's "Africanist deviation".

Years later, in 1911, speaking over the tomb of Joaquín Costa, Unamuno argued that the regeneracionist leader had not been a Europeanizer but rather a "great African", or "Celtiberian", whose followers placed him under the banner of Europeanization while merely popularizing the term.

Spanish

Es inútil darle vueltas, nuestro don es ante todo un don literario, y todo aquí, incluso la filosofía, se convierte en literatura... y si alguna metafísica española tenemos es la mística... ¿es esto malo, es bueno? por ahora no lo decido, sólo digo que es así. ... y como hay y debe haber una diferenciación del trabajo espiritual así como del corporal, tanto en los pueblos como en los individuos, a nosotros nos ha tocado esta tarea... en Suiza no pueden desarrollarse grandes marinos... Alemania, verbigracia, nos da a Kant, y nosotros le damos a Cervantes. Harto hacemos con procurar enterarnos de lo suyo, que su ciencia y su metafísica fecundará nuestra literatura, y ojalá nuestra literatura llegue a ser tal que fecunde su ciencia y su metafísica. Y he aquí el significado de mi exclamación, algo paradójica, lo reconozco, "¡que inventen ellos!", exclamación de que tanto finge indignarse algún atropellado cuyo don es el de no querer entender o hacer como que no se entera.

Translation

It is useless to turn it over further: our gift is above all a literary gift, and everything here – even philosophy – becomes literature... and if we have any Spanish metaphysics it is mysticism... Is this bad or good? For now I do not decide; I merely say that it is so. ... Just as there must be a division of spiritual labor as well as physical labor, both among peoples and among individuals, this task has fallen to us... In Switzerland great sailors cannot develop... Germany, for example, gives us Kant, and we give it Cervantes. It is enough for us to try to understand their work, so that their science and metaphysics may fertilize our literature, and perhaps our literature will one day fertilize their science and metaphysics. And this is the meaning of my somewhat paradoxical exclamation, I admit: "let them invent!" – an expression that some hurried people pretend to find scandalous, whose gift is not to understand or to pretend they do not understand.

In the epilogue to The Tragic Sense of Life in Man and in Peoples (1912), Unamuno wrote:

Spanish

No ha mucho hubo quien hizo que se escandalizaba de aquello de "que inventen ellos", expresión paradójica a la que no renuncio.

Translation

Not long ago there were those who pretended to be scandalized by my phrase "let them invent", a paradoxical expression that I do not renounce.

To support this idea, he cited Joseph de Maistre (in a letter to a Russian minister):

Spanish

"no por no estar hecha para la ciencia debe una nación estimarse en menos".

Translation

A nation should not esteem itself less simply because it is not made for science.

He then continued with a challenge:

Spanish

que no tenemos un espíritu científico ¿y qué importa si tenemos algún otro?... no basta defenderse, hay que atacar

Translation

So we do not have a scientific spirit – what does it matter if we possess another? ... It is not enough to defend ourselves; we must also attack.

In the final lines of the epilogue he referred directly to Ortega's campaign in favor of Europeanization:

Spanish

y ahora vosotros, Bachilleres Carrascos del regeneracionismo europeizante, jóvenes que trabajáis a la europea con método y crítica científicos, haced riqueza, haced patria, haced ciencia, haced ética, o más bien traducid "Kultura", que así mataréis a la vida y a la muerte. Para lo que ha de durarnos todo.

Translation

And now yourselves, Bachellors Carrasques of europeanisant regeneracionism, working joungers à l'européenne with methods and scientific critique, make richness, make fatherland, make science, make ethique, or better translate "Kulture", this is how you kills the life and the death. For what we last all.

The Unamunonian Quixotism, assumed by Unamuno himself comparing his polemist with the Bachellor Sansón Carrasco, other of the permanent themes of his literary production, and like the science and progress, confluent in his conception of Ser de España.

== See also ==
- África empieza en los Pirineos
