= Africa begins at the Pyrenees =

Derogatory expression

África empieza en los Pirineos ("Africa begins in the Pyrenees") is a derogatory expression used against Spain—and, due to their geographical location, Portugal, Andorra, and Gibraltar—based on the geographical situation of the Iberian Peninsula and referring to the difference or contrast between the absolutist Spain of the 19th century and the more liberal and developed France of the time. It originated in France and was attributed to Alexandre Dumas, a claim that has been refuted by Nestor Luján. Jean-Frédéric Schaub documents a similar quote from Stendhal in his book La France espagnole. Les racines hispaniques de l’absolutisme français (2003): "If the Spanish were Muslim, they would be completely African".

It originated sometime during Napoleonic France or the early 19th century; it was mainly used in the context of the Peninsular War by some French, Portuguese, and Spanish politicians and intellectuals throughout that century. It was also common in 20th-century Spain, where it was used in a burlesque manner in absolutist and reactionary circles opposed to the spread of liberalism in Spain as a way of legitimizing the underdevelopment of Spanish regions in the face of the modernizing proposals of the Frenchified. Historians García de Cortázar and González Vega wrote that, whether derogatory or not, the expression is merely "a reflection of the cultural specificity of the peninsula, which is difficult to assimilate into the categories of developed countries", particularly during much of the 19th and 20th centuries.

In his book The Races of Europe, American professor and racial theorist William Z. Ripley also proposed the idea that "Africa begins beyond the Pyrenees":

"Beyond the Pyrenees begins Africa. Once that natural barrier is crossed, the Mediterranean racial type in all its purity confronts us. The human phenomena is entirely parallel with the sudden transition to the flora and fauna of the south. The Iberian population thus isolated from the rest of Europe, are allied in all important anthropological respects with the peoples inhabiting Africa north of the Sahara, from the Red Sea to the Atlantic."

As part of his global outreach efforts, Wilhelm Faupel, Nazi German director of the Ibero-American Institute, sought, through the Ministry of Propaganda, to have hispanophobic publications removed from circulation in Germany, such as those of Arnold Noldens (pseudonym of Wilhelm Pferdekamp), one of whom bore the title Afrika beginnt hinter den Pyrenäen ("Africa begins behind the Pyrenees").

According to Sandra Curley, the 19th century disdain for Spain, evinced by this derogatory expression, can be traced back to the end of the Reconquista. 16th to 18th century English writers starting from the Anglo-Spanish War frequently associated Spanish culture and heritage with Moors, Africa and/or the Orient to paint the country as 'un-European', backwards and barbaric, a stereotype which spread to Scottish, Welsh, French, and American writings.

According to José María Ortega Sánchez (1977) in the article "The origins of Islam in Spain, mercenaries, missionaries, students and converts (and II)", the phrase was coined by Domingo António de Sousa Coutinho (1760–1833) when commenting on the work of Dominique de Pradt (1759–1837) Mémoires historiques sur la révolution d'Espagne (1816). The Portuguese Domingo António de Sousa Coutinho, commenting in the book La guerre de la Péninsule sous son véritable point de vue (Brussels: Weissenbruch 1819 p.xxiv), wrote about the relationship that the Iberian Peninsula had with both Africa and the rest of Europe.

There have also been intellectuals who have tried to turn its meaning around and use it as a source of pride, as was the case with Miguel de Unamuno in Sobre la independencia de la patria (On the Independence of the Fatherland, 1908). Others, such as Antonio Machado, took offense at it and argued against it.

Francoist Spain attempted to reclaim the expression and promoted it in tourism during the 1950s and 1960s. Franco's Africanist view, while gradually becoming less prevalent, survived until the end of the regime.

== See also ==
- Black Legend
- Mottos of Francoist Spain
- ¡Que inventen ellos!
- Spanish practices
- Anti-Spanish sentiment
