= Warner Fite =

American philosopher

Warner H. Fite (5 March 1867 – 23 June 1955) was an American philosopher.

== Biography ==
Warner Fite was born in Philadelphia. He graduated with a BA from Haverford College in 1889 and received his PhD in philosophy from the University of Pennsylvania in 1894. Besides teaching at the University of Chicago (1897–1901), Fite also worked at the University of Texas (1903–1906), Indiana University (1906–1908) and Harvard University (1911–1912). He held the chair of Stuart Professor of Ethics at Princeton University from 1917 until his retirement in 1935.

Warner Fite died in 1955.

== Works ==
- An Introductory Study of Ethics (1903).
- Individualism (1911).
- Birth-Control and Biological Ethics (1916).
- Moral Philosophy (1925).
  - The Examined Life: An Adventure in Moral Philosophy (1957).
- The Living Mind (1930).
- The Platonic Legend (1934).
- Jesus: The Man (1946).

Translations

- Mist: A Tragicomic Novel, by Miguel de Unamuno (1928).

Selected articles

- "Art, Industry and Science," The Psychological Review, Vol. VIII, No. 2, 1901, pp. 128–144.
- "The Monaural Localization of Sound," The Psychological Review, Vol. VIII, No. 3, 1901, pp. 225–246 (with James Rowland Angell).
- "Further Observations on the Monaural Localization of Sound," The Psychological Review, Vol. VIII, No. 5, 1901, pp. 449–458 (with James Rowland Angell).
- "The Place of Pleasure and Pain in the Functional Psychology," The Psychological Review, Vol. X, 1903, pp. 633–644.
- "The Social Implications of Consciousness," The Journal of Philosophy, Vol. X, No. 14, 1913, pp. 365–374.
- "Pragmatism and Science," Philosophical Review, Vol. XXIII, 1914, pp. 410-429.
- "The Barbarian Invasion," The Unpopular Review, Vol. I, No. 2, 1914, pp. 389–406.
- "A New Essay in the Psychology of Advertising," The Unpopular Review, Vol. IV, No. 1, 1915, pp. 110–119.
- "Moral Valuations and Economic Laws," The Journal of Philosophy, Vol. XIV, No. 1, 1917, pp. 5–20.
- "Consciousness: Where is It?," The Journal of Philosophy, Vol. XIV, No. 11, 1917, pp. 281–288.
- "The Philosopher and his Words," Philosophical Review, Vol. XLIV, 1935, pp. 120–137.
