= Tragic Sense of Life =

1913 book by Miguel de Unamuno

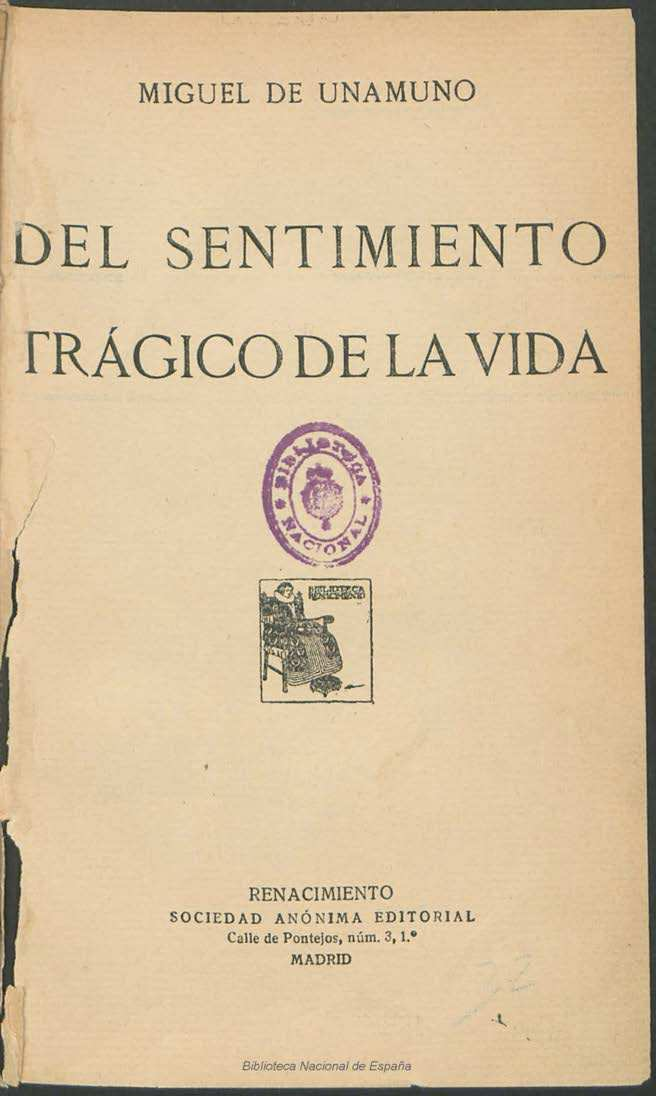
- Author: Miguel de Unamuno
- Original title: Del sentimiento trágico de la vida
- Language: Spanish
- Publication date: 1913
- Publication place: Spain
- English publication date: 1921
- Pages: 320

Tragic Sense of Life (Spanish: Del sentimiento trágico de la vida) is a 1913 book by the Spanish writer Miguel de Unamuno. It promotes a sceptical outlook where struggle and processes toward understanding are sources of meaning, and where a belief in God is motivated by the desire to exist and a fundamental legitimacy of feelings as sources of understanding.

The book was translated into many languages, including English in 1921. The Catholic Church in Spain condemned it as dangerous. It was placed on the Index Librorum Prohibitorum in 1957.

According to the scholar Miguel Ángel Cordero Del Campo, the worldview presented in the book is not truly tragic, in the sense of affirming reality by embracing limitations, but is instead based on a romantic affirmation of anxiety and agony.
