= Peace in War =

Novel by Miguel de Unamuno

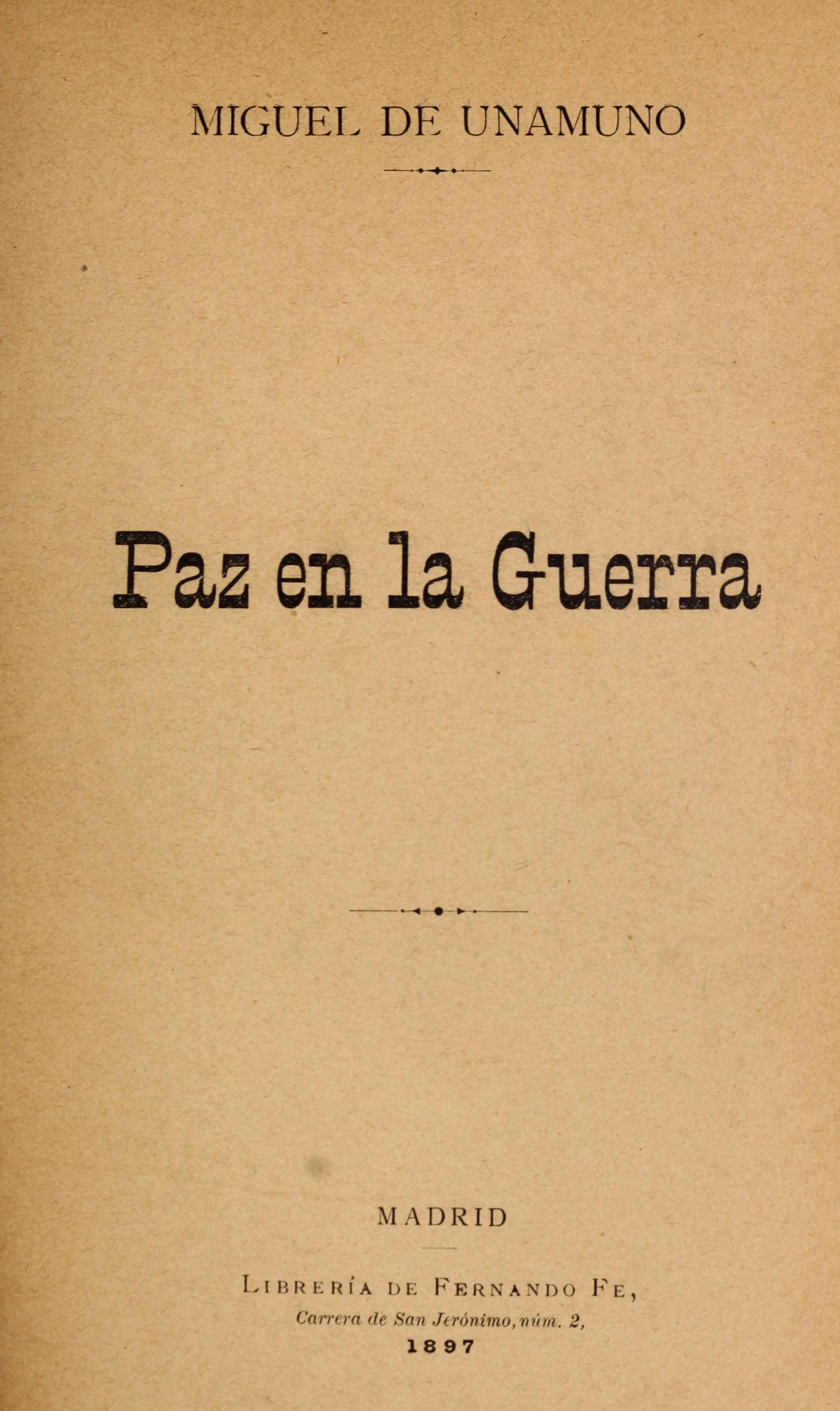

Peace in War (Spanish: originally Paz en la Guerra, in recent editions Paz en la guerra, the title sometimes translated into English as Peace of War) is a mid-size novel by Miguel de Unamuno. Having been written since the mid-1880s, it was published in 1897. The narrative is set mostly in Bilbao and surroundings during the Spanish civil war of 1872-1876, with particular focus on the siege of the city in 1874. The protagonists are mostly Bilbao dwellers, some of Carlist and some of Liberal political preferences. The plot revolves around the fate of Ignacio Iturriondo, a man in his early 20s, who volunteered to Carlist troops. The book was generally well received by the press and the critics, but it failed to make a major impact and was not re-published until 1923. Issued in Latin America in the 1910s, in the inter-war period the novel was translated into German and Czech, and afterwards into some other European languages.

== Author ==
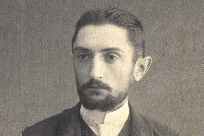
Unamuno, 1890s

The 1874 siege of Bilbao, which forms the narrative framework of Paz en la Guerra, was witnessed from the inside by Unamuno, who at the time was a 10-year-old boy. When commencing work on the novel, he was in his early 30s; following a university spell in Madrid he lived in Bilbao and worked as a teacher of Latin in the local Instituto. His literary record was null: at about this time he started publishing articles in local papers, and some of them resembled the format of short stories. In 1891 he got married and assumed the chair of Greek at the University of Salamanca, where he moved with his wife; the couple would have first 3 children during the following 5 years. The scale of his press contributions became significant, and he started to make a name for himself in the local Biscay and Salmantine ambience. In 1895, during final period of editing Paz en la Guerra, Unamuno published his first book, En torno al casticismo, a set of sophisticated essays on Castillan self, tradition and history; this volume gained him attention among Spanish intellectuals, though initially it did not make a major impact in terms of popular discourse.

== Spain of the mid-1890s ==
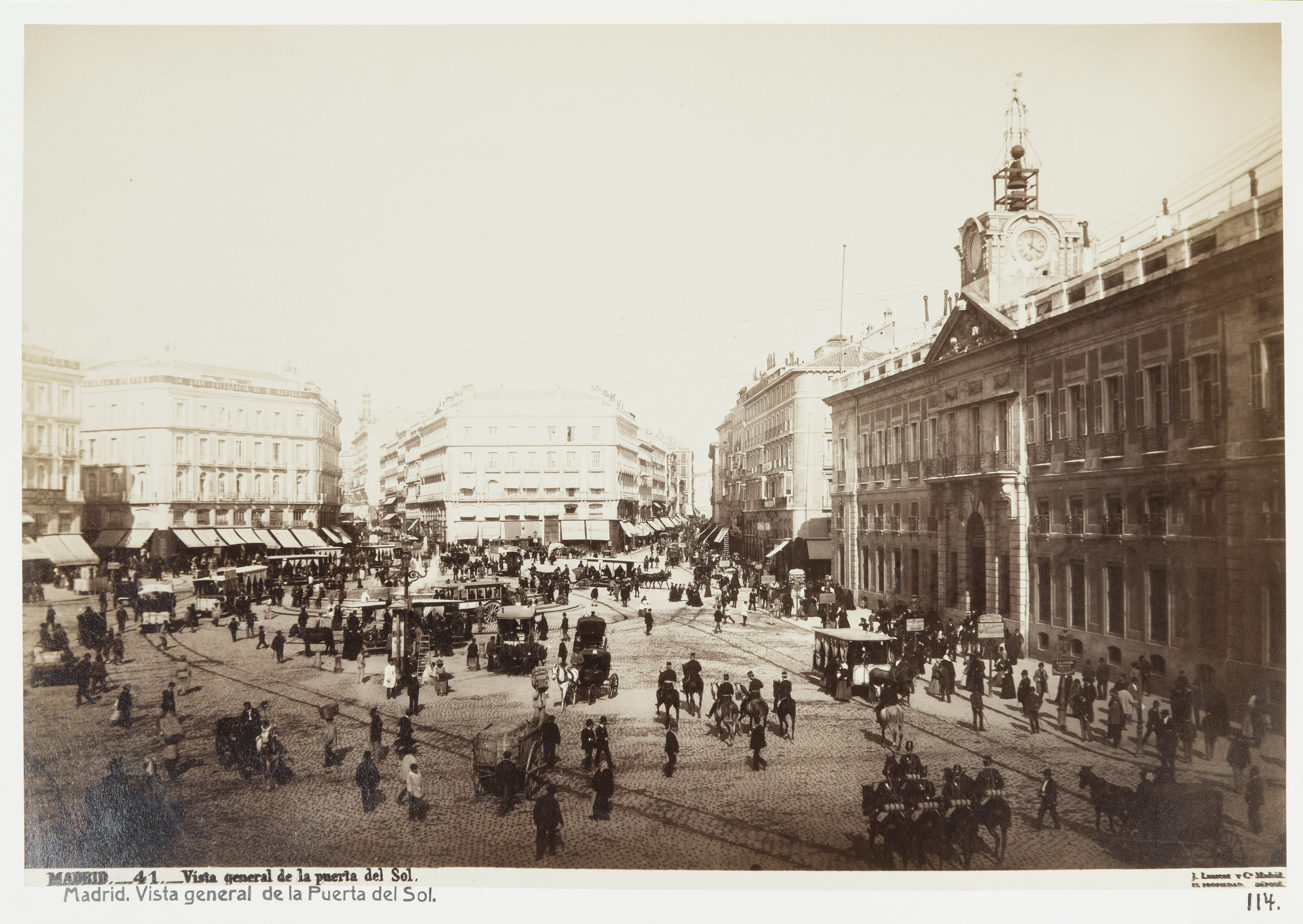
Madrid, mid-1890s

When the novel was published Spain has been enjoying some 20 years of political stability, the first such period in the 19th century. The regime, usually named "Restoration", was monarchy combined with parliamentarian liberal democracy; two key parties were interchanging at power and fundamental flaws of the system – its elitism, corruption and caciquismo – were not clearly visible yet. For few years the country has already been fighting the war in Cuba against local independentists, but at the time no-one knew that within a year it would develop into the war against the United States and would produce a massive disaster, a cultural shock that would be one of major milestones of Spanish history. Carlism, defeated in the civil war 22 years before, appeared to have been a threat long gone, reduced to a second-rate party which abandoned its insurgent ideas. The Basque nationalism was merely in its nascent phase, with scarce following and reduced to very few institutional outposts. First republican parties started to win seats in the parliament, while the socialist ones failed to do so; the level of social tension was moderate.

== Writing the novel ==
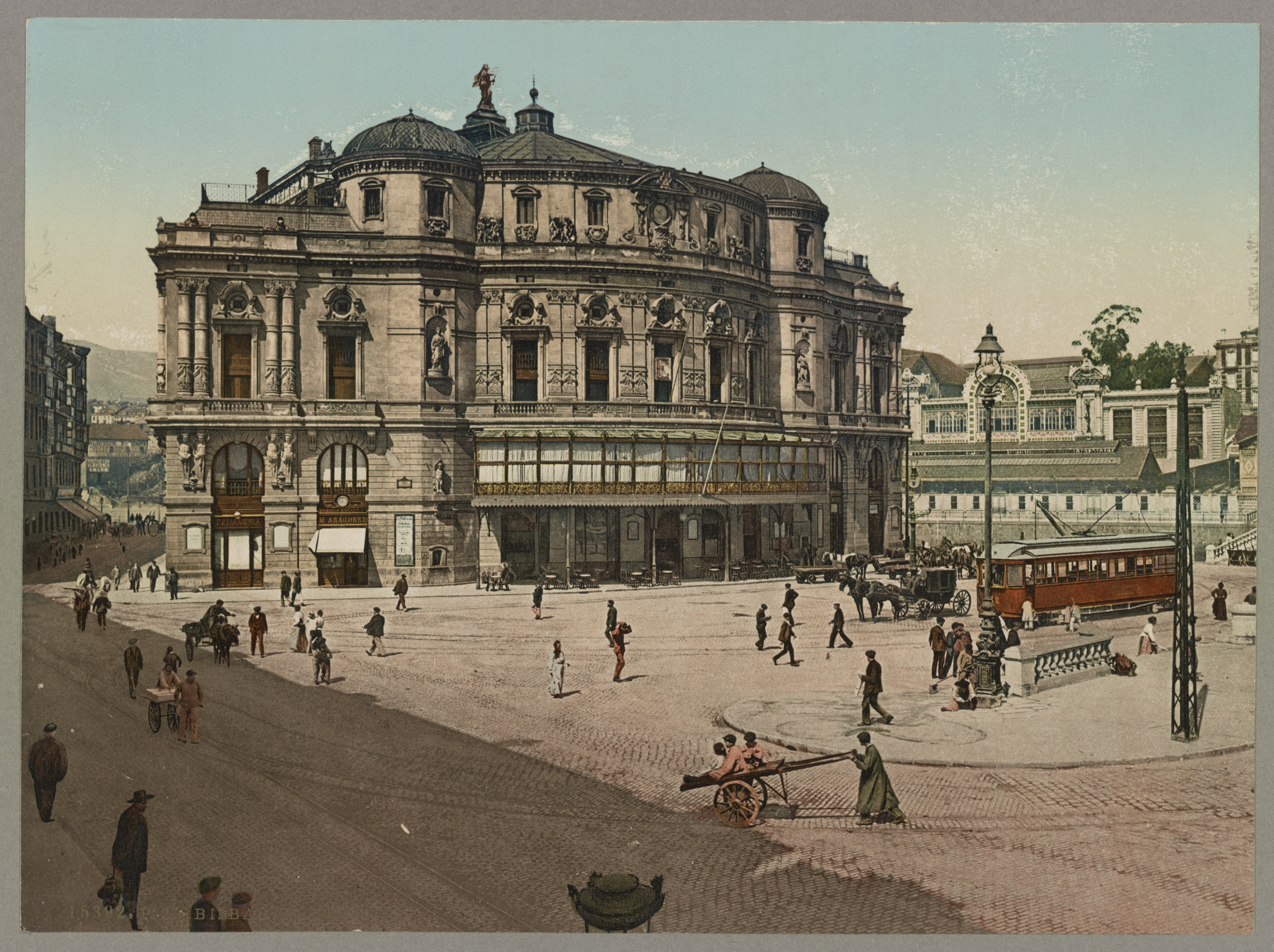
Bilbao, 1890s

According to his later claim Unamuno was writing Paz en la Guerra for some 12 years, which points to the mid-1880s as the moment of its inception. It seems that it was written in the late 1880s in Bilbao, and then edited in the early 1890s in Salamanca. At that time Unamuno was influenced by Herbert Spencer. Some of his essays published in Biscay newspapers in the late 1880s and early 1890s contained images which later appeared in the novel, mostly related to depictions of Bilbao. The most evident case is an 1887 story Solitaña; it features a fictional character which bears some resemblance to Pedro Iturriondo and contains “themes and preoccupations” developed in Paz en la Guerra. In 1891 the author confessed in a private letter that initially he intended “una novelita corta” which he planned to finish in 3-4 months; later it grew to “novela histórico-político-religiosa-etc-etc” and there was still 1-2 years needed to complete it. Though Unamuno partially relied on his own infantile memories from the times of war, he also extensively consulted archival copies of newspapers issued during the siege, e.g. La Guerra. It seems that his narrative was mostly completed in the early 1890s, and later years were dedicated to editing. The novel was considered ready in early 1896.

== Publication ==
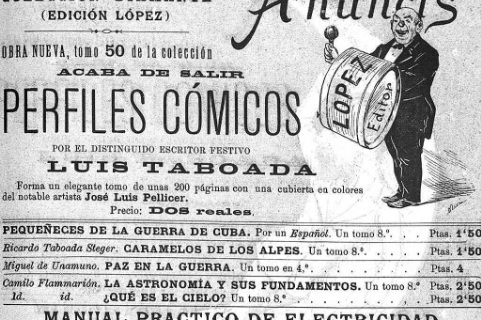
novel's press adverts, 1897

Unamuno’s key advisor in publishing matters was José María Soltura Urrutia, a wealthy Biscay intellectual who eventually financed the edition. Having finished writing, in March 1896 Unamuno intended to get the book published as soon as possible, but was advised to wait until the summer or perhaps even later; eventually the book appeared on the market in early 1897. Initially he wanted to release it with one of the Bilbao publishing houses, but he was persuaded to rely rather on a Madrid company. The book was printed in December 1896 by the Bilbao firm Imprenta Muller y Zavaleta, but it got officially released in January 1897 by the Madrid publishing house Librería de Fernando Fé. Its print run was moderate 1.503 copies (at the time novels of established authors like Galdós or Pereda had a print run of 3-5.000 copies). During commercial negotiations in late 1896 Fé offered Unamuno the royalty of 2.000 ptas, but eventually the writer earned 1.500 ptas (his annual salary at the university was 3.500 ptas). The book was sold at the price of 4 ptas (above the usual price of 2 ptas) and enjoyed some sort of marketing campaign. Single copies were sent out to various critics and institutions.

== First reception ==
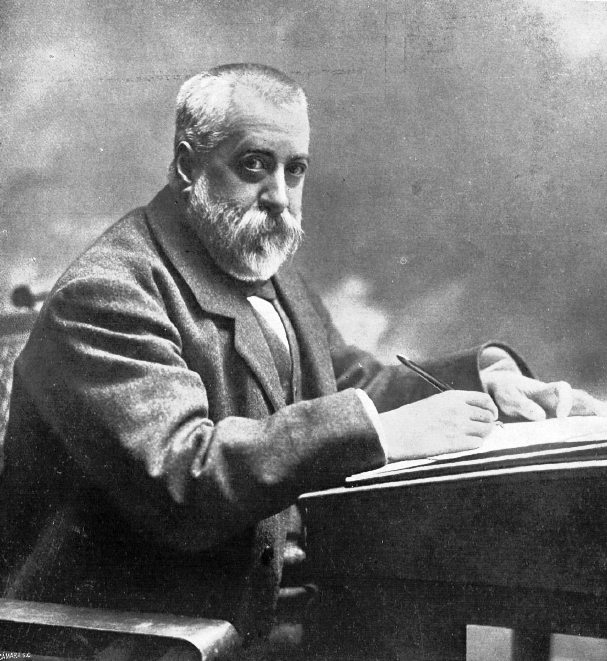
Menendez Pelayo

The book sold out within a year; unlike novels of popular authors, re-issued every some time, it would not be re-published for quarter of a century. In the press the novel was rather well received, both in daily papers and specialized literary magazines; some classified it as “obra literaria de verdadera importancia” and used it as a benchmark for other novels. One reviewer saw it as a tale about two conflicting protagonists: the city and the village. Another focused rather on psychology of the characters and especially on Pachico, singled out as the key personality. One more described it as a “philosophical novel” and warned readers not to expect torrid action, though he complained that protagonists are “demasiado razonadores y filósofos”. Some viewed it as a novelistic analysis of the phenomenon of war and its impact, making references to Tolstoy’s War and Peace. Some had difficulty when trying to categorize the novel, and referred to “novela verdaderement inclasifiable”. Among key figures of literary critique the reception was mixed. Marcelino Menéndez Pelayo reportedly liked the book; Urbano González Serrano did not respond favorably. Also some other reviewers, like Francisco Navarro Ledesma, remained rather critical.

== Characters ==
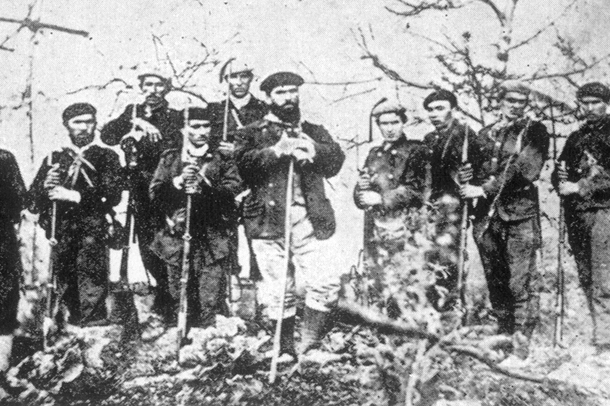
Carlist insurgents, 1870s

Major:

- Ignacio Iturriondo, born 1849, the only child of Pedro Antonio and Josefa Ignacia. When adolescent an apprentice in a trading business of a certain Aguirre, did not speak Basque well. Secretly adored Rafaela. As teenager naive and somewhat romantic, later rather inarticulate. Initially engaged in Carlist leafleting propaganda. Brainwashed by Celestino, following outbreak of the war he volunteered to Carlist troops. Took part in the siege of Bilbao. He asked for transfer to zone of intense combat, shot during the Battle of Somorrostro in 1874
- Josefa Ignacia, wife to Pedro Antonio, of similar age, also ethnic Basque, called Pepiñasi by her husband, mother of Ignacio, simple, family-devoted, religious woman. During the war together with her husband they moved to his native village. Initially in despair following loss of her son, later somewhat reconciled. During final months of the war with her husband they returned to Bilbao, where she died shortly after
- Juan Arana, owner of a successful trading business, a moderate liberal, then supporter of king Amadeo and Borbonic restoration, barely religious, decisively anti-Carlist. The neighbor of Pedro Antonio, with whom he maintained mostly correct, though at times tense relations. Father of Juanito and Rafaela, husband of Micaela. Has spent the war in Bilbao, afterwards he purchased some land in the area and resumed his religious practice
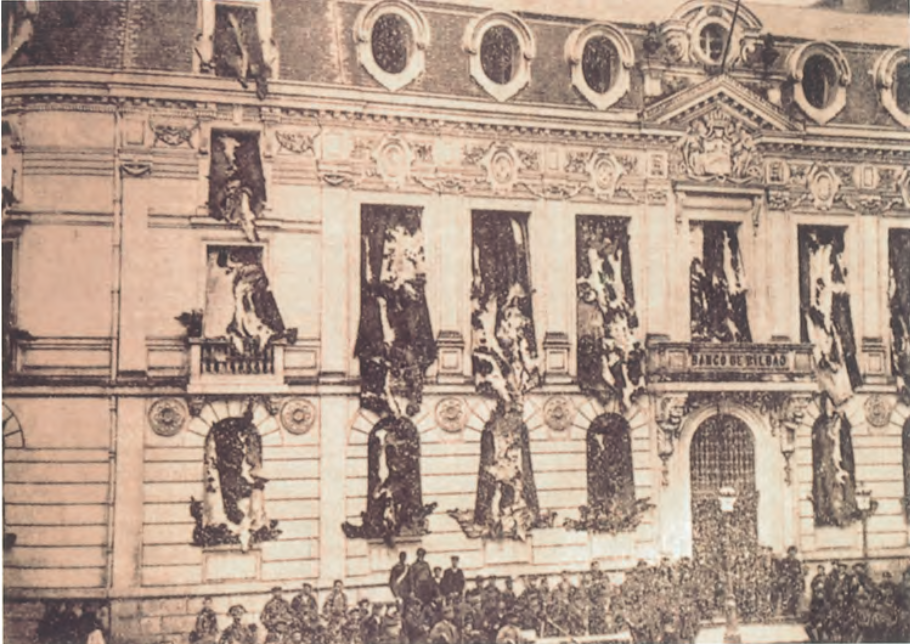
besieged Bilbao, 1874
- Pachico or Francisco Zabalbide, about Ignacio’s age and his former school colleague, of poor health, orphan brought up by his uncle. A solitary, following the period of juvenile religious exaltation he became independent in thought. He kept reading a lot, tried to rationalize his Catholic faith and was sort of a contradiction seeker. During early phase of the war with his uncle they moved away from Bilbao, but returned afterwards; he kept walking across nearby hills, meditating life
- Pedro Antonio Iturriondo, born 1812, from a rural Biscay family, ethnic Basque. In his youth worked in his uncle’s confectionery shop in Bilbao. Volunteered to legitimist troops during the First Carlist War, then he inherited the confectionery business. Husband of Josefa Ignacia, father of Ignacio. Though a tranquil man and non-belligerent Carlist, he supported the Carlist conspiracy financially and supported Ignacio’s decision to volunteer. During the war with his wife they left Bilbao for his native village, but returned in 1875, though they did not have the confectionery shop any more. Widowed, he got melancholic and kept wandering in the Begoña neighborhood recollecting his youth and his lost son

Secondary:

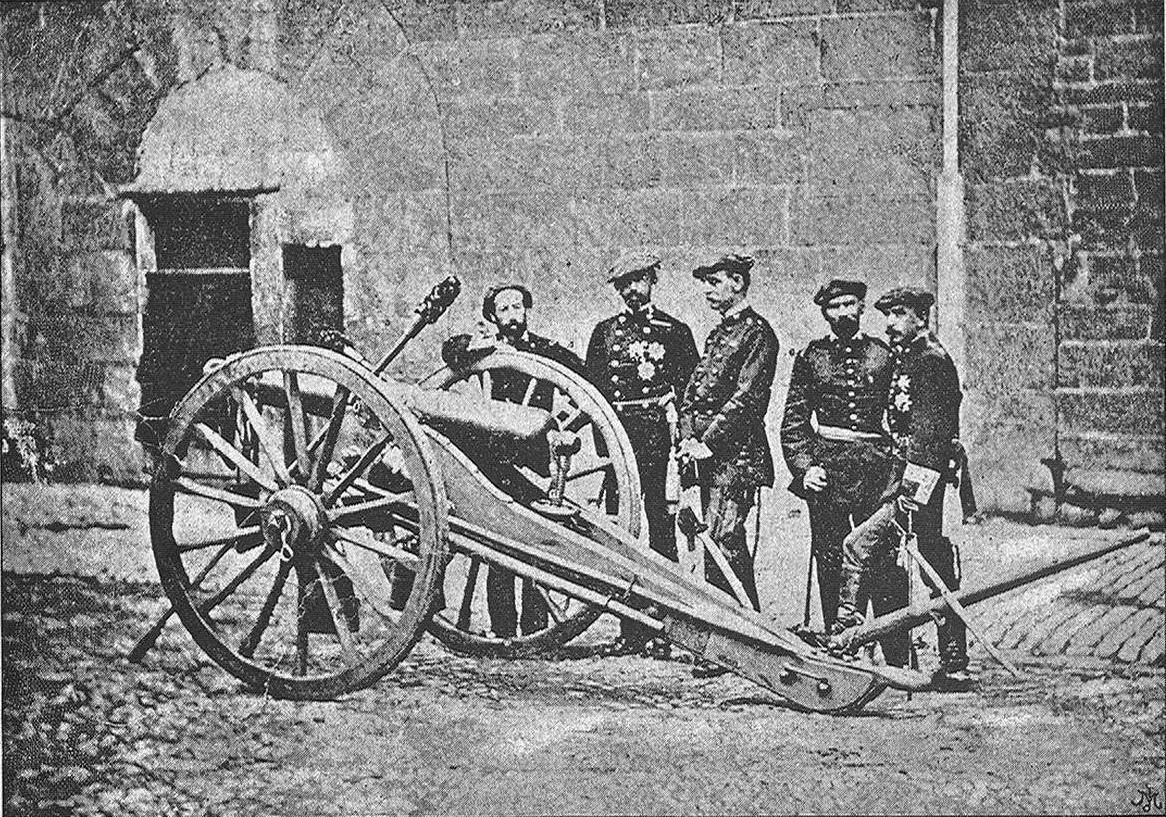
Carlist artillery, 1870s
- Celestino, young and freshly graduated lawyer from Castile, who settled in Bilbao. He did not understand Basque. Well educated but exalted, a Carlist fanatic and eloquent propagandist. As an intellectual and initially authority for Ignacio, he was somewhat responsible for his volunteering. During the war a Carlist officer, very arrogant, to be loathed by Ignacio. Demonstrated perhaps insincere Carlist enthusiasm almost until the end of the war, in early 1876 crossed to France
- don Pascual, the cousin of Pedro Antonio, Catholic priest, who tried to educate Ignacio in Catholic piety. Politically a firm reactionary and anti-liberal, reader of novels by Aparisi Guijarro. Fanatic Carlist supporter, after the war he embraced Integrism and turned against Carlos VII, whom he charged with cesarism, though he remained a sworn anti-liberal
- José María, friend of Pedro Antonio who used to form his circle of companions. Apparently engaged in pre-war Carlist conspiracy, he convinced Pedro Antonio to invest some money in a shady Carlist deal. During the war offended by Pedro Antonio’s enquiries as to the money invested, after the war still engaged in mounting some obscure Carlist-related financial schemes and looking for people willing to invest
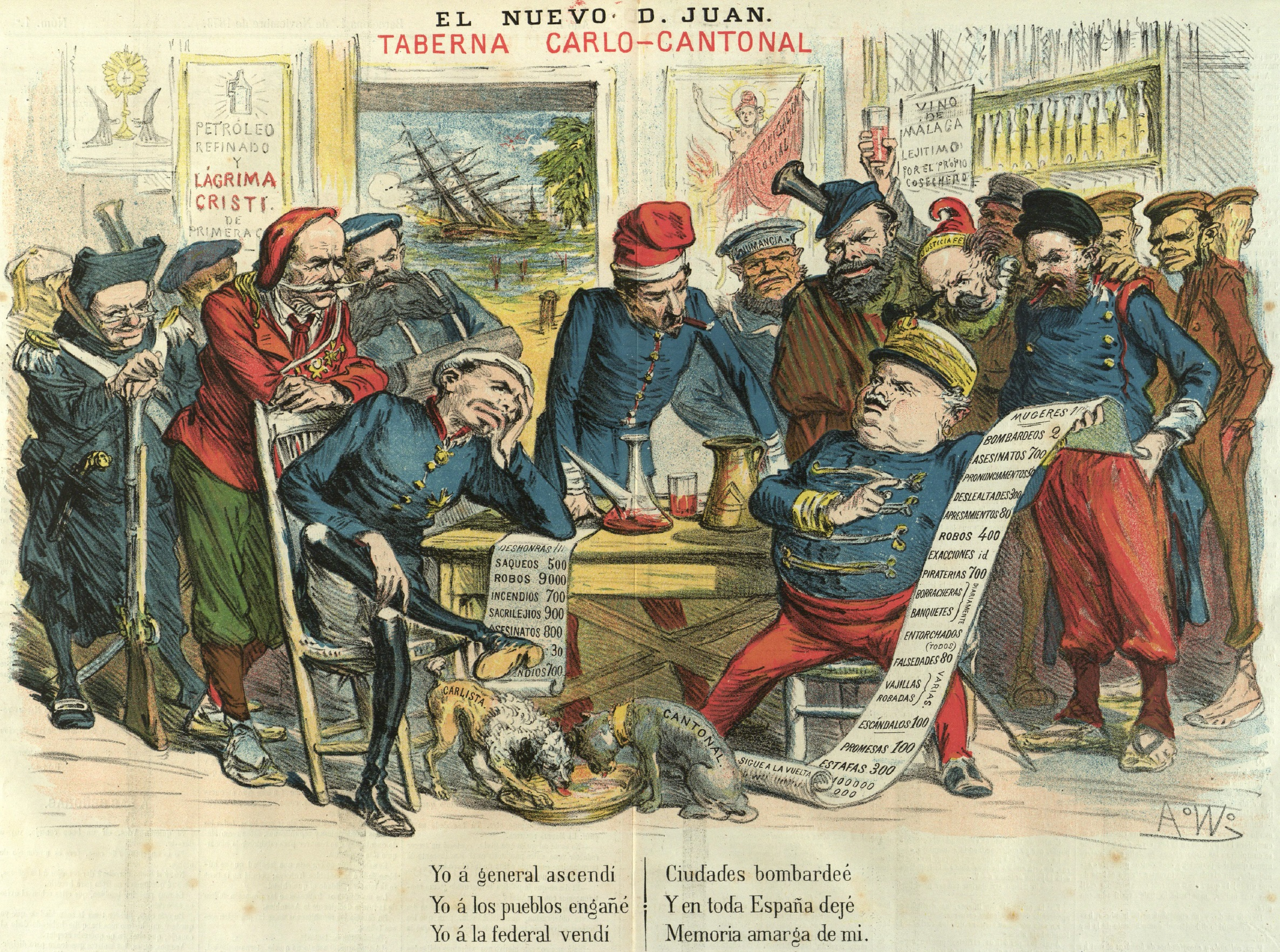
Carlists in liberal press, 1870s
- Juan José, Ignacio’s colleague and friend, who liked singing and music. He volunteered to Carlist troops and spent most of the war in ranks. When defeated he crossed to France but afterwards he returned to Bilbao, furious and outspoken about abolition of autonomous Basque provincial regulations
- Juanito, son of Juan Arana and Micaela Arana, brother of Rafaela. He was a friend of Ignacio and as children they played together, though later he developed militantly liberal ideas, too radical even for his own father. He abandoned his juvenile Catholic faith. During the war in liberal Bilbao militia, afterwards engaged wholeheartedly in the family business and lost interest in politics, dedicated entirely to making money
- Rafaela, daughter of Juan and Micaela Arana, sister of Juanito, a girl more or less secretly adored by Ignacio and her uncle Miguel. She also seemed to like Ignacio, but they have not established a relationship before he went to war. Not interested in politics. Pursued by Enrique in besieged Bilbao, she matured fast following death of her mother. Willing to live a regular, normal life and have children, she married Enrique

other:

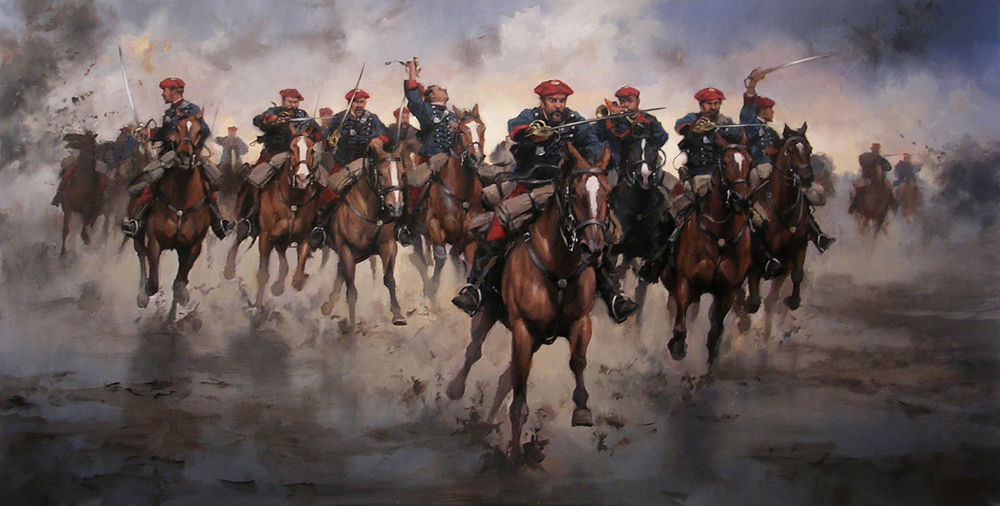
art: charge of Carlos' cavalry
- Domingo, tenant at don Emeterio’s property, calm and cheerful farmer, dedicated to regular, daily work, befriended by Ignacio
- don Braulio, who spent some time in America, owner of a small plot in Castile, Carlist, friend of Pedro Antonio
- don Emeterio, brother of Pedro Antonio, parish priest in a Biscay countryside, Carlist, maintained faith in victory until the end; during the war he hosted his brother in his home
- don Epifanio, liberal veteran of First Carlist War, friend of the Aranas, who used to cheer them up during the siege of Bilbao
- don Eustaquio, former Carlist officer, one of Pedro Antonio’s friends; he was pensioned by the government and accepted political status quo. After the war he lost interest in the cause and got very religious
- doña Mariquita, Enrique’s grandmother. In besieged city she was telling her recollections from the siege of Bilbao during the First Carlist War
- Enrique, boy from the neighborhood, in liberal militia during the war. He adored Rafaela and eventually married her
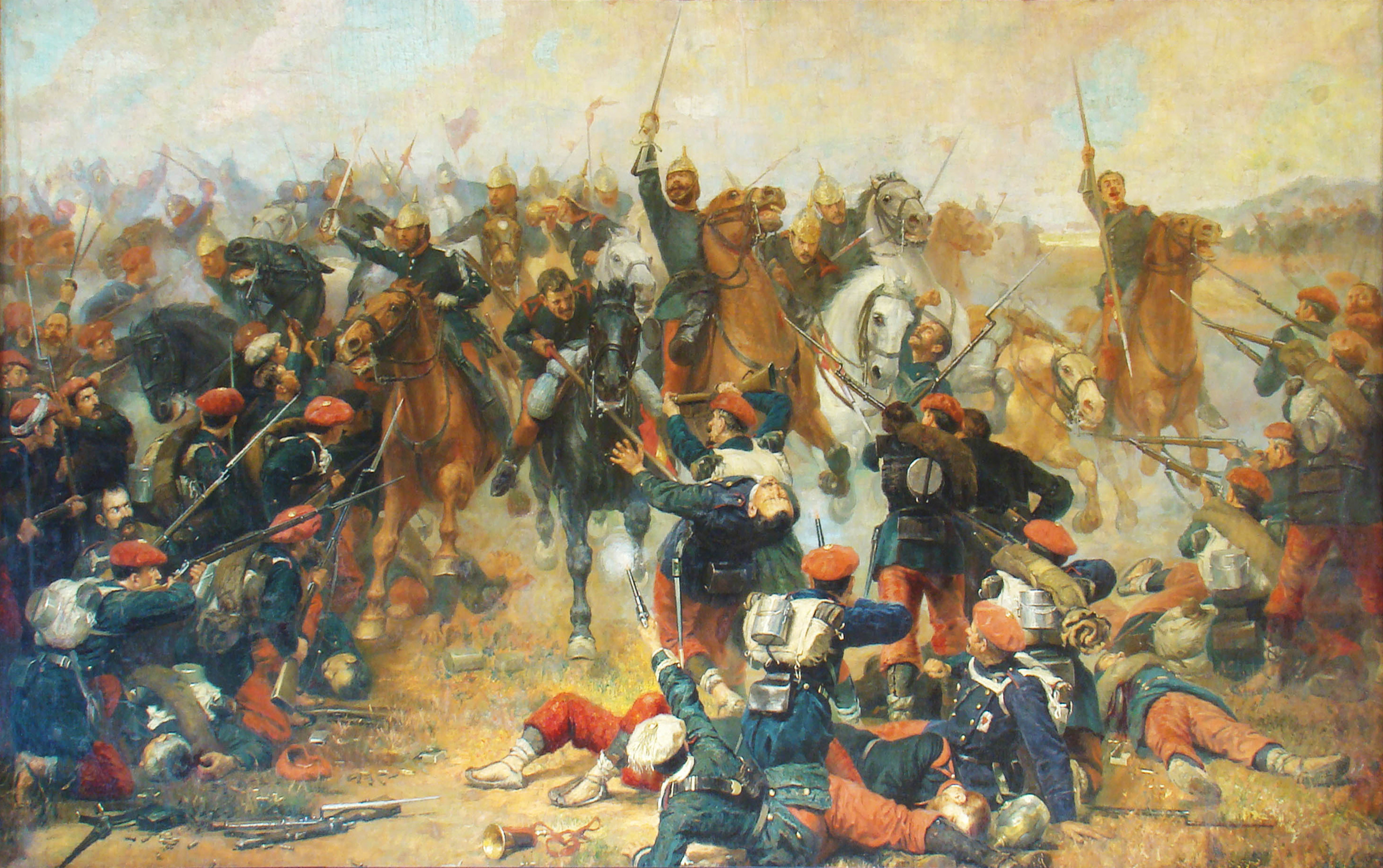
art: charge of Alfonso's cavalry
- Gambelu, old wartime companion of Pedro Antonio, during the war maintained enthusiasm for the Carlist cause almost until the end of the conflict in 1876
- Marcelino, son of Juan and Micaela Arana, younger brother of Juanito and Rafaela, who used to tease her
- Miguel Arana, younger brother of Juan Arana, like him a vehement anti-Carlist, also co-owner of the trading business. A bachelor and a bit of an oddball, owner of indecent books. He secretly adored his niece, Rafaela
- Rafael, Ignacio’s colleague, fond of reading poetry, himself also a poet
- Ramona, sister of Pedro Antonio and don Emeterio, briefly married to a marine captain and then widowed. Lived with don Emeterio in the Basque village and was running his daily economy

The narrative features also some historic figures, like Manuel Santa Cruz, Antonio Lizárraga or the claimant Carlos VII. However, they appear not as protagonists but as part of background developments, e.g. Ignacio watches Santa Cruz ride across a small town and Pedro watches Carlos VII swear by the Guernica oak.

== Plot ==
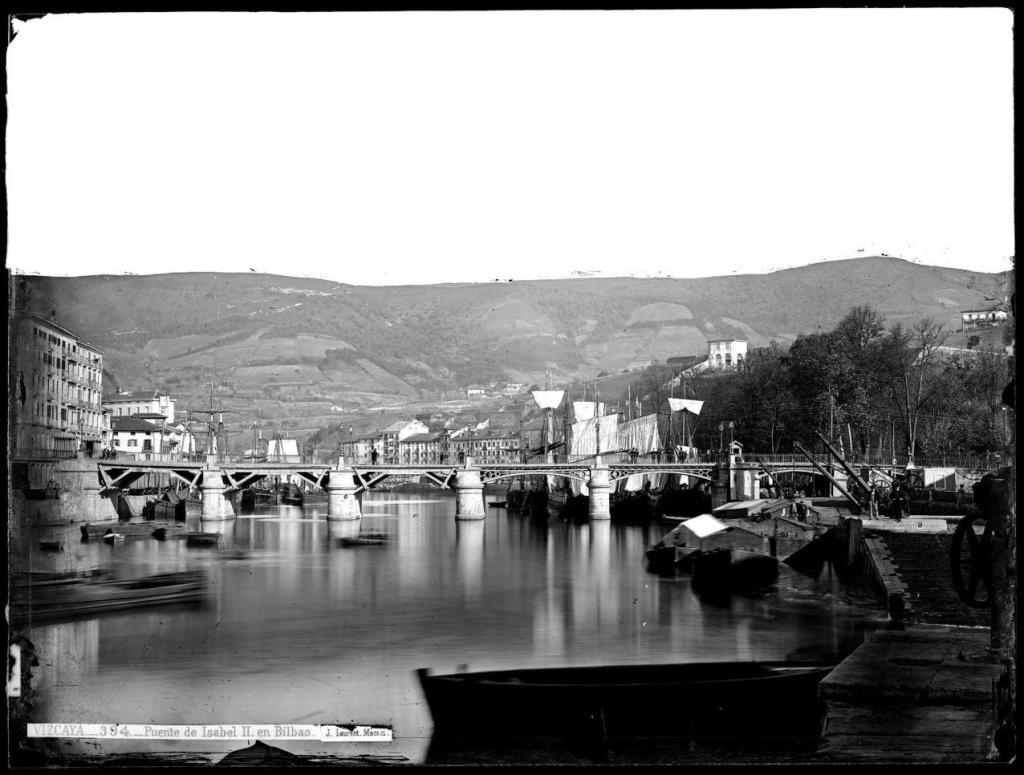
Bilbao, 1870s

The novel is divided into 5 untitled but numbered chapters:

- 1. Pedro Antonio and his friends Gambelu, don Pascual, don Braulio, don Eustaquio, José María meet regularly over wine and discuss political developments of 1867-1871 as they are unfolding. They hope that the Carlist claimant would topple the regime, though some do not seem very much convinced about it. José María runs obscure Carlist financial scheme and convinces Pedro to invest money, assuring him of future hefty returns. Ignacio turns from adolescent boy to a man, frequents bars, visits prostitutes, takes part in street brawls; his parents are concerned about what they believe to a be a sinister influence of Juanito, son of a godless liberal. In fact, Ignacio is partially influenced by hipereloquent Celestino, who keeps advocating the Carlist cause, and partially by Pachico, an independent skeptic.
- 2. 1872: Carlists rise, but their initial rebellion is easily quashed. Juan José, who volunteered to the rebels, enthusiastically briefs Ignacio on war developments. In April 1873 Ignacio, with veiled encouragement from his father, volunteers to Carlist troops. Juan José and Celestino also volunteer. They see little combat, most time is spent on marches, drills and bivouacs. Ignacio’s unit accompanies the claimant Carlos VII to Guernica and then to Estella. Ignacio is visited by his parents, he also once visits them in Bilbao. Later, as liberal city dwellers demonstrate some hostility to Pedro and his wife, they abandon Bilbao and settle in Pedro’s native village, at the house owned by don Emeterio. In late 1873 they meet there Ignacio, whose unit is briefly stationed in the village.
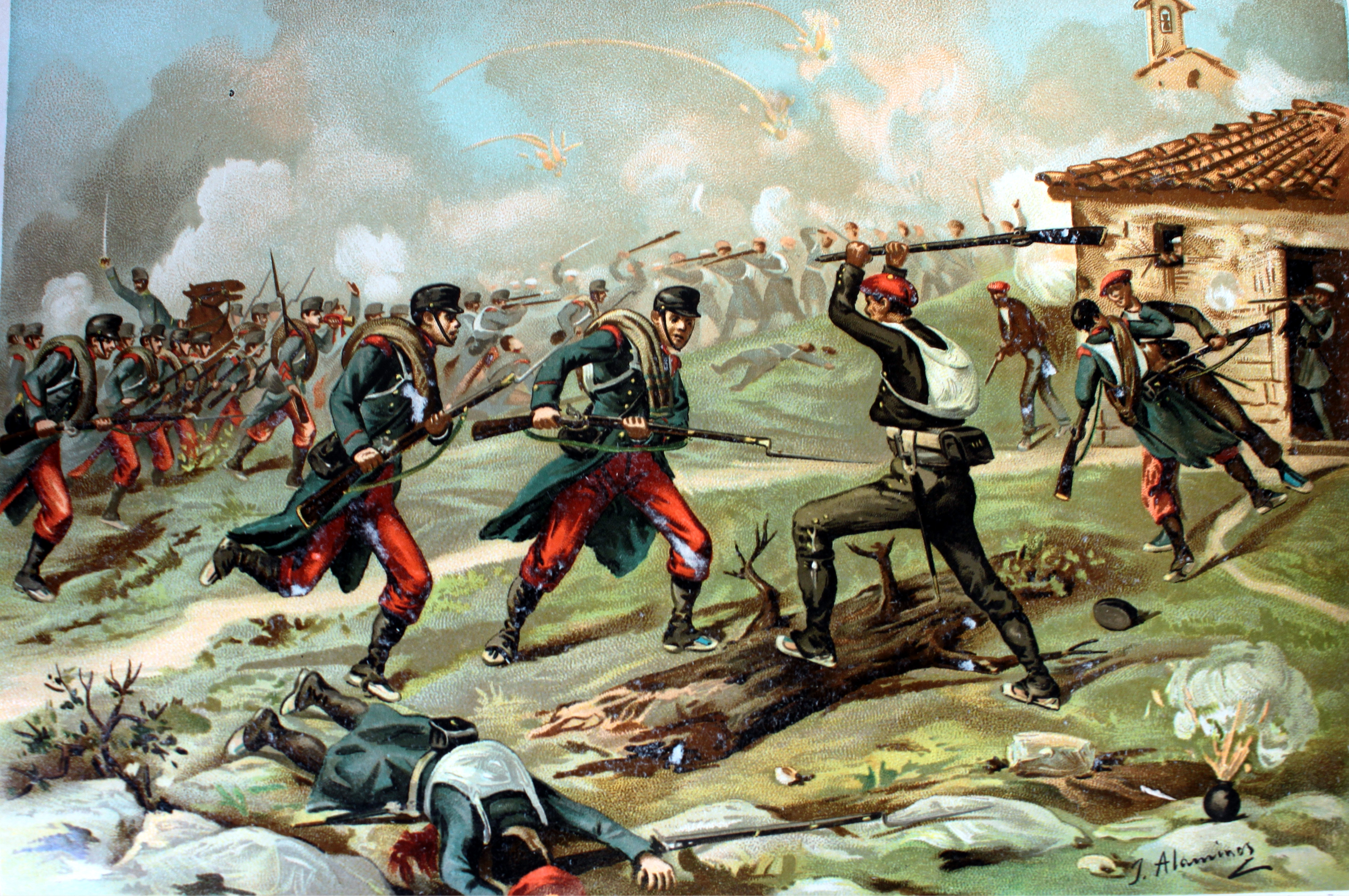
art: battle of Somorrostro (1874)
- 3. Back in mid-1873: the Arana brothers go about their daily business in Bilbao, while Enrique pursues Rafaela. In early 1874 the city is besieged by the Carlists, who pound the city with artillery. Micaela struggles among shortage of goods, rising prices and hardships of daily life. A circle of friends regularly meet at the Aranas, discussing developments. Micaela, who suffers health problems, dies, and her daughter Rafaela starts to look after the house. Meantime in the Carlist ranks Ignacio takes part in the siege and is disappointed with sluggish attacks; he requests transfer to the combat zone. Juanito and Enrique are in liberal militia, and during moments of truce they meet Ignacio. In May 1874 the siege is broken by advancing liberal troops, the city explodes with joy. Miguel Arana dies.
- 4. Back in March 1874: as requested Ignacio is moved to the Somorrostro zone, where he takes part in heavy combat, including a bayonet charge. In April he is shot dead. Officers of both armies discuss truce. When learning about death of Ignacio, Josefa Ignacia is desperate, while Pedro Antonio is reconciled with the fate and accepts it as the will of God, this is also the message from don Pascual. In the Arana family Juanito cheers the death of Ignacio, while Rafaela is saddened. It turns out that in 1873 Pachico and his old uncle left Bilbao and settled in a small town at the Cantabrian coast; now he wanders in the nearby countryside, contemplates life and writes a diary. He cries having learnt about Ignacio’s death.
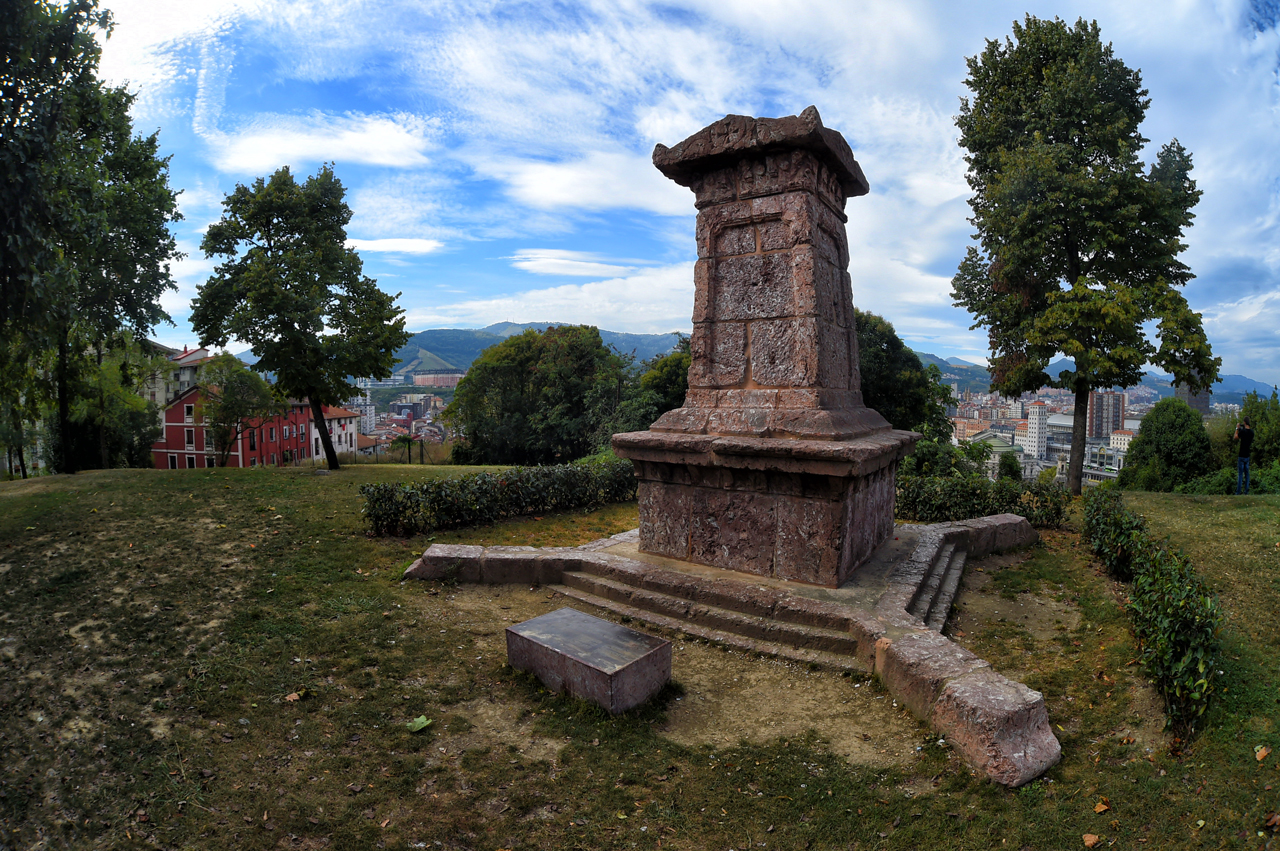
Begoña hills today
- 5. Pedro got melancholic and keeps regretting his lost son and lost money, invested in the Carlist cause. Josefa slowly comes to terms with the death of Ignacio. In July 1875 Pedro travels to witness Carlos VII swear Basque rights by the Guernica oak, where he breaks into tears. In February 1876 Celestino and Juan José with last Carlist troops cross to France. Pedro and Josefa return to their home in Bilbao; they do not have their shop, taken over by someone else, and live off savings, Josefa dies shortly. Old friends do not meet any more. Rafaela marries Enrique. Widowed Pedro spends his days walking the hills around Begoña, melancholically reconciled with fate. Pachico, who returned to Bilbao, also wonders around, reflecting upon history, God and life.

== Title ==
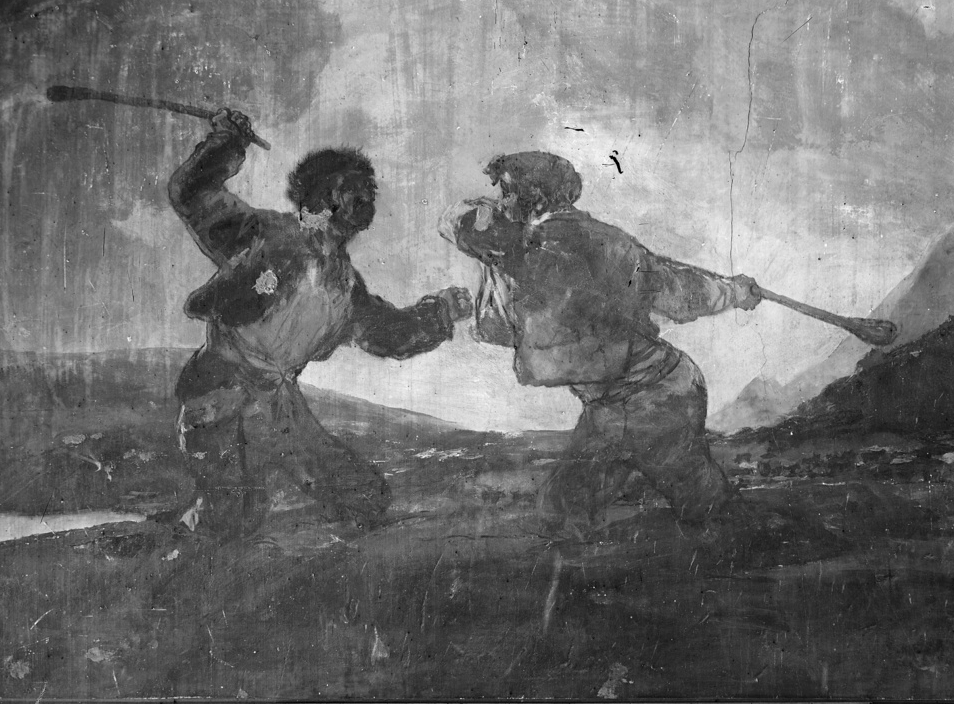
Goya, Fight with Cudgels

In the novel there are few explicit or close references to “peace in war”:

- in chapter 3, during the siege the people of Bilbao “live the life of peace in the middle of the war”,
- shortly later, more specifically, the circle of Arana friends hold reunions of “peace in war”.
- in chapter 5, by the very end of the book, Pachico climbs the hills around Bilbao, watches the sea and contemplates nature and history, while his internal monologue turns into general reflection of the storyteller. At one point it turns towards peace which is “harmony of dissonances; peace in the war itself and behind the war, endlessly sustaining and crowning it”.
- few paragraphs later, the very ending of the book reads: “It is in the bosom of true and deep peace that war is only understood and justified; it is where sacred vows are made to fight for the truth, the only eternal consolation; it is where war turns into holy work. Not outside of it, but within it, in its very bosom, we must seek peace; peace in the war itself.”

== Unamuno and the novel (1897-1936) ==
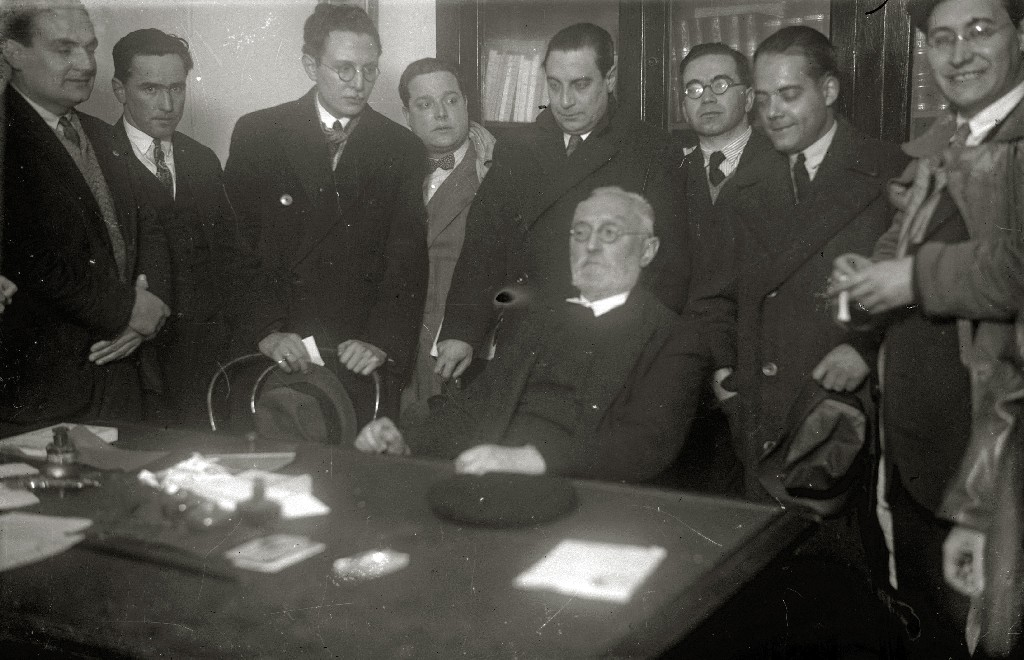
Unamuno, 1930

Unamuno was profoundly disappointed by what he perceived to have been a rather moderate reception of the novel. He believed that the book – which took him 12 years to write and edit – has not been properly digested and thought over. Later he also held a grudge against critics – like González Serrano – who remained lukewarm. Soltura tried to comfort him that though read by few, it would be being read for decades to come. It is not clear whether either Unamuno or his publisher contemplated re-edition – a customary action in case of successful novels – in the 1900s or 1910s. The novel was published again in 1923 with no changes, except corrections of few typos in the original edition. However, it was preceded by the author’s 2-page prologue. Unamuno confessed the narrative contained "the flower and the fruit of my childhood and youth experience". He noted that the novel "remains as relevant as it was when first published" and finished with a statement: "esto no es una novela; es un pueblo". Neither print run nor commercial performance of the edition are clear. In Spain there was no further re-edition of the novel during Unamuno’s lifetime. In 1933 he published an article, titled Paz en la guerra, which provided some insights into his mindset when writing the novel and his reflections on the subject in mid-1930s. It is known that in late 1936, during his last months and overwhelmed by brutality of the unfolding civil war, Unamuno had some second thoughts as to the novel. He declared that "la experiencia de esta guerra” makes him rethink his own work, starting with Paz en la Guerra.

== Foreign translations ==
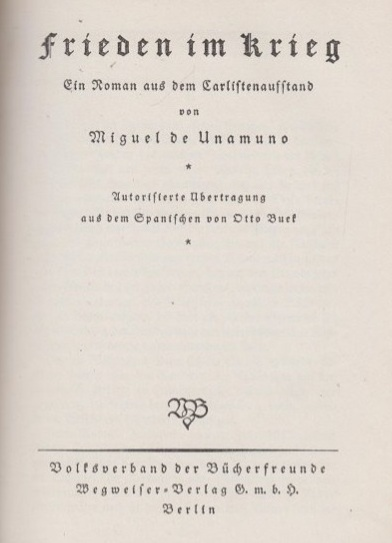
first foreign edition

First edition of Paz en la Guerra has been barely noticed beyond Spain, at best referred in bibliographic listings. Some excerpts translated into Italian by Arturo Frontini were published as Pace nella guerra in 1901. Because of his articles in French press Unamuno became a fairly known author north of the Pyrennees, but Paz en la Guerra did not attract attention. Unamuno himself was interested in foreign editions, but prioritised works of "una orientación menos localista y menos centrada en cuestiones nacionales", which put Paz en la Guerra at disadvantage. It was the second Spanish edition of 1923 which triggered interest. Its result was the first full translation, the German Frieden im Krieg by Otto Buek (Berlin 1929). The second in sequence was by Karel Eger into Czech, Mír ve válce (Praha 1932). Gilberto Beccari published full Italian version (Firenze 1952). The fourth known translation was into Polish by Kalina Wojciechowska (Pokój wśród wojny, Kraków 1975). In Britain, where Unamuno's novels "never made much headway", Peace in War appeared thanks to Anthony Kerrigan, Allen Lacy and Martin Nozick (London/New York 1983). The first French translation appeared in Canada, the work of Alain Guy and Louis Jolicoeur (Paix dans la guerre, Montreal 1988). The last globally spoken language the work was translated into was Russian; Владимир Валериевич Симонов published it as Мир среди войны (Санкт-Петербург 2000). The last identified translations are by Богдан Чума into Ukrainian (Мир у війні, Львів 2019) and by Јелена Рајић into Serbian (Мир у рату, Београд 2021).

== Reading ==
Reviewers, critics and historians of literature focused on various threads of the novel:

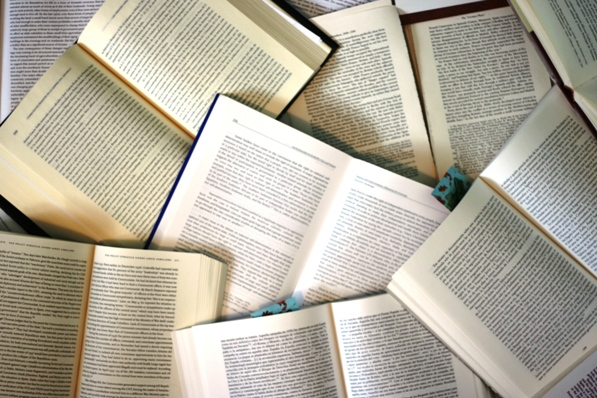

- war, at times specifically as civil war. Within this perspective, the novel is approached as a discourse on impact of war on either communities or individuals. The book is set against the background of world-famous novels related to war. Conclusions differ; some analysts viewed the book as a grand call for peace; others saw a praise of war, at least the one understood as a confrontation of ideas
- Basque, Biscay, Bilbao. This perspective is about discussion of local identity and local features, which might be calibrated as focus on the city (Bilbao), the province (Biscay) or the region (Basque Country). The point of interest might be language, customs, geography etc. Given Unamuno’s rather ambiguous position towards Basque identity, the book could be interpreted either as immersed in local self, or as a vision of Basque identity within the Spanish cultural domain
- Carlism. The prevailing approach is that to Unamuno, there were two Carlisms: one was genuine but unconscious, communitarian in spirit, a popular voice that Unamuno sympathized with. At the end of the novel, for example, Ignacio is remembered by Pachico as a "Beautiful Soul" Another Carlism was an ideological superstructure, built by "bachilleres, canónigos, curas y barberos ergotistas y raciocinadores", infected with Integrism and forming part of political history. Unamuno was initially suspected of Carlist sympathies, he was quick to deny them
- historical process. Within this perspective, the focus is on either universal or specifically Spanish rules of development. The prevailing opinion is that Unamuno confronted positivismo histórico, which presented history as constant progress, and advocated a dialectic vision. Within this perspective, various even contradictory ingredients formed an amalgam, and a new quality emerged out of it

== See also ==
- Miguel de Unamuno
- Carlism in literature
- History of Bilbao
