= Abel Sánchez: The History of a Passion =

1917 novel by Miguel de Unamuno

Abel Sánchez
- Author: Miguel De Unamuno
- Original title: Abel Sánchez: una historia de pasión
- Language: Spanish
- Publisher: Renacimiento
- Publication date: 1917
- Publication place: Spain
- Media type: Printed
- Pages: 233 pages
- ISBN: 978-84-7039-458-4
- Followed by: Abel Sánchez: una historia de pasión (1947)

Abel Sánchez: A Story of Passion (Spanish: Abel Sánchez: Una historia de pasión) is a 1917 novel by Miguel de Unamuno. Abel Sanchez is a re-telling of the story of Cain and Abel set in modern times, which uses the parable to explore themes of envy.

== Plot ==
Abel Sánchez is a version of the Biblical story of Cain and Abel. The Cain of the novel is named Joaquín. Though they are not brothers, they have grown up together, competing as brothers would. Abel becomes a famous and recognized painter while Joaquín becomes a well-known doctor. Joaquín's goal is to outdo Abel by making medical discoveries, thus competing with Abel's art by excelling at science, which also is an art. Joaquín always has been jealous of Abel and competitive with him, but what bothers him most is that Abel does not feel the same sense of rivalry. Abel marries Helena, Joaquín's cousin, whom Joaquín hoped to wed. To allay his envy and hatred, Joaquín marries Antonia, not out of love but simply to maintain his competitive standing with Abel. Abel and Helena have a son named Abelín, Joaquín and Antonia have a daughter named Joaquina. Joaquín lives out his jealous ambitions through his daughter. As the story of Cain and Abel ends, so does this novel. Reaching the point of utter hatred, Joaquín takes Abel's life. When Joaquín dies, he apologizes to his family. Realizing that his life was consumed by hatred and envy, he says that if only he had loved his wife, Antonia, she could have been his savior.

Replete with biblical comparisons, the book shows what one's life becomes when one is consumed by envy or hatred. Joaquín had no life of his own, as his hatred of Abel overwhelmed every aspect of his life. Even though the protagonist is Joaquín, the book is titled Abel Sánchez because Joaquín's character is formed wholly from his intense feelings toward Abel.

== Sources ==
- Unamuno, Miguel de (1928): Abel Sanchez, ed. de Carlos A. Charles A. Longhurst, Cátedra, Madrid, 1995.
- Abellán, José Luis (1985): a critical introduction to Abel Sanchez, Castalia, Madrid.
- Zamorano Arregui, Teresa M. (1996): Structure and narrative techniques in the short story of the Generation of 98: Unamuno, Azorin and Baroja, Schedules of RILCA EUNSA, Pamplona, 1998.
- Ayala, Francisco (1974): "The novel of Unamuno," The novel, Galdós and Unamuno, Seix-Barral, Barcelona.
- Amorós, Andrés (1971): "Unamuno: The novel as a search for" Introduction to the contemporary novel. Madrid, Anaya, pp. 265–276.
- Claveria, Carlos (1953): "On the subject of Cain in the work of Unamuno," in José Luis Abellán, Issues of Unamuno, Gredos, Madrid, pp. 97–129.
- Cobb, Christopher H. (1972): "On the development of Abel Sanchez", Journal of the Chair Miguel de Unamuno, XXII
- Diaz-Peterson, Rosendo (1972), "Abel Sánchez de Unamuno, a conflict between life and scholasticism", Arbor, 341.
- Díez, Ricardo (1976): The aesthetic development of Unamuno's novel, Nova-Scholar, Madrid.
- Elizalde, Ignacio (1983): Miguel de Unamuno and his fiction, Caja de Ahorros Provincial de Guipuzcoa, San Sebastian.
- González Egido, Luciano (1987): a critical introduction to Abel Sanchez, Alianza ed., Unamuno Library, 1997.
- Longhurst, Carlos A. (1995): a critical introduction to Abel Sanchez, ed. Cátedra, Madrid.

== External pages ==
- Abel Sánchez: una historia de pasión
