= Mist (novel) =

1914 novel by Miguel de Unamuno

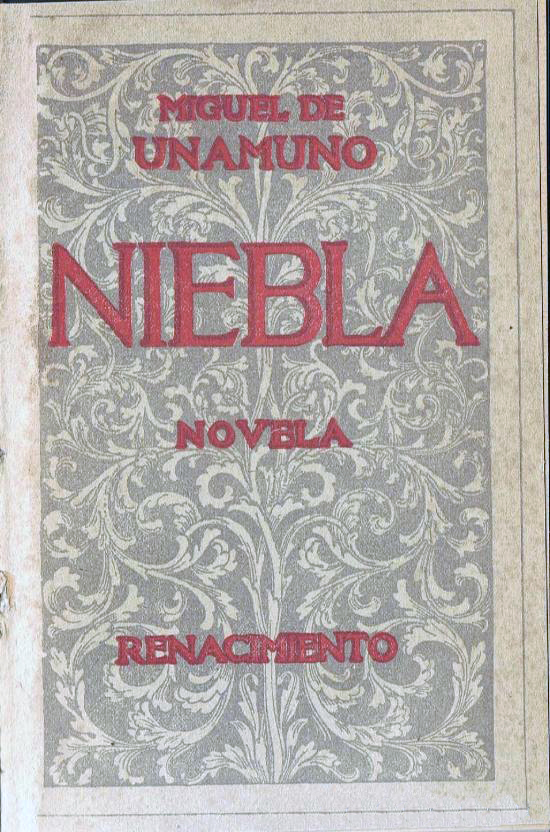
- First edition of Niebla, 1914
- Author: Miguel de Unamuno
- Original title: Niebla
- Translator: Warner Fite (1928), John Macklin (2014), Elena Barcia (2017)
- Language: Spanish
- Genre: Modernist metafiction
- Publisher: Editorial Renacimiento
- Publication date: 1914
- Publication place: Spain
- English publication date: 1928
- Media type: Print

Mist (Spanish: Niebla) is a nivola (a variant form of novel first proposed in the text of Mist itself) written by Miguel de Unamuno in 1907 and first published in 1914. It is often hailed as one of the greatest novels written in Spanish, both by popular critics and by academics.

Mist tells the story of Augusto Pérez, a rich young lawyer and a widow's only son, and the romantic and existential problems he lives through as he begins to question the purpose of his everyday life and finally visits Unamuno himself, who tells Augusto he is a fictional entity. It has been the subject of extensive scholarly study, which often focuses on the philosophical and aesthetic ideas Unamuno explores throughout the book.

Warner Fite's English translation of Mist, first published in 1928, rendered the full title as Mist: A Tragicomic Novel. The title of the book was alternately rendered as Fog in a translation by Elena Barcia published by Northwestern University Press in 2017.

== Historical and social context ==
Spain was significantly politically weakened after the death of Alfonso XII in 1885 and the ascendance of his widow, Maria Christina of Austria, as queen regent. Conservative landowners and liberals alike defended the principles of absolute monarchy, while a substantial number of peasant uprisings in Puerto Rico and Cuba, Spain's last territories in the Americas, gave rise to the "Grito de Baire" and the Cuban War of Independence.

The United States intervened in Cuba, citing the sinking of the USS Maine and its intention to "protect the lives and financial interests of Americans." After Spain's failed attempt to retain its colony through a reform that would have conferred a considerable degree of autonomy in January 1898, in April the United States intervened in the conflict and declared war on Spain. In December, after an encounter that Laín Entralgo calls shameful for lasting only seven hours, and for the fact that the only death from the action was that of the captain of the American ship from a heart attack, Spain signed the Treaty of Paris, which gave Cuba independence and recognized Puerto Rico as a U.S. possession.

These events affected Spain's standing as a nation and as a society; its greatness was diminished, and its decline in the face of the advancements of neighboring countries gave the impression that it was at a historic low point. In Spanish society, this created a sense of emptiness and feelings of an absence of history. This phenomenon interested Spain's intellectual community, which laid out a two-part goal: that Spain should catch up to the rest of Europe with regard to science and culture, and that the Spanish people should cultivate a new concept of their homeland and mobilize for social advancement.

Against this background, Joaquín Costa's Regenerationism movement appeared on the scene and sought Spanish reconstruction through effective agrarian reform and the widespread institution of high-quality education. Working toward this recovery, he believed that culture was the only method by which the entire nation could progress, as the transformation of Spain depended on greater knowledge and not on solutions to societal problems. Within this group of intellectuals, a group of Spanish writers proposed the use of literary discourse to elevate criticisms dealing with three primary themes: the Spanish reality of the moment, focused on the "civilized" and "modern" way of life and the way Spaniards put it into practice; the history of Spain and the current circumstances this history had produced; and the peculiar psychology of the Spanish man. This group became known as the Generation of '98 and counted among its number authors such as Azorín, Antonio Machado, Pío Baroja, Ramiro de Maeztu, Ramón del Valle-Inclán, and Miguel de Unamuno. Azorín stated in 1902 that the critical work of his generation was "the ferocious analysis of everything."

== Literary movement ==
At the start of the 20th century, positivism began to lose its influence as principles once considered absolute truths began to come into question in philosophical and historiographical circles. An epistemological crisis emerged: philosophers arrived at the conclusion that mankind was completely incapable of reaching the truth and knowing everything that is universally valid, and historiographers declared that knowing the absolute factual truth about history was impossible.

With these changes in intellectual thought, realism and naturalism also lost influence after having been the primary model for novelists until that time. Authors were no longer interested in capturing the characters' surroundings; they preferred to focus on the interiority of the individual in search of his own truth and who tried to understand his reality. This new narrative mode was named "modernism."

According to C.A. Longhurst, the European modernist period can be divided into two periods, the first beginning in the 1890s and running until World War I, and the second from the end of World War I until the beginning of World War II in Europe or, in Spain, until the Civil War. In the first period, a reader could see the realist novel evolving from its focus on external and social themes to a focus on the internal and psychological; Galdós and Pardo Bazán were the principal authors of the transition. The change was cemented by the writers of the Generation of 98, who did not completely separate from the social context but rejected the idea that this was "the individual's point of reference." The modernists no longer considered the novel to be a tool for reflecting society, but preferred to center it on subjectivity.

According to Longhurst's classification, Mist is a part of the second period of modernism, along with works such as Azorín's Doña Inés and Valle-Inclán's Tirano Banderas; among the principal characteristics of these works are the understated plots, shallower characterization, and greater flexibility of literary form. The modernists begin to explore and innovate with form, which becomes more playful and self-referential.

== Plot summary ==
The plot revolves around the character of Augusto, a wealthy, intellectual, and introverted young man; he falls in love with a young woman named Eugenia as she walks past him on the street, and he sets about trying to court her. He is aided in his efforts by the other members of Eugenia's household. Her Aunt Ermelinda is particularly keen for a relationship to evolve, so that Augusto might help with her niece's financial troubles. Nevertheless, Eugenia rejects his advances, since she is already in a relationship with the down-and-out Mauricio. Augusto pays off Eugenia's mortgage as a goodwill gesture without her knowing, but this only serves to insult Eugenia, rather than endear him to her.

In the meantime, Augusto becomes involved with another girl, Rosario, and he begins to question if he is really in love with Eugenia at all. After talking with various friends and acquaintances, Augusto decides he will propose to Eugenia in any case. To his surprise, Eugenia accepts the engagement. A few days before the marriage is to occur, Augusto receives a letter from Eugenia. The letter explained that she was leaving him for Mauricio. Augusto, heartbroken, decides to kill himself.

Because everything Augusto does involves a lengthy thought process, he decides that he needs to consult Unamuno himself (the author of the novel), who had written an article on suicide which Augusto had read; when Augusto speaks with Unamuno, the truth is revealed that Augusto is actually a fictional character whom Unamuno has created. Augusto is not real, Unamuno explains, and for that reason cannot kill himself. Augusto asserts that he exists, even though he acknowledges internally that he doesn't, and threatens Unamuno by telling him that he is not the ultimate author. Augusto reminds Unamuno that he might be just a character in one of God's dreams. Augusto returns to his home and dies.

Whether or not he is killed by Unamuno or commits suicide is a subject of debate and is mostly down to the reader's opinion; the book ends with the author himself debating whether to bring back the character of Augusto, ultimately establishing that this would not be feasible; the eulogy is given by Orfeo, Augusto's dog.

The title, Spanish for "mist" or "fog," is a reference to how Augusto sees his life. Augusto describes his world as full of small and almost imperceptible occurrences, some of them good, some of them bad, that all serve to obscure his vision.

== Characters ==
Augusto Pérez: main character.

Víctor Goti: Augusto's best friend.

Miguel de Unamuno: renowned Spanish writer whom Augusto decides to visit when in search of life advice.

Eugenia Domingo Del Arco: piano instructor and acquaintance of Augusto.

Mauricio: Eugenia's lover. He is also a friend for Rosario.

Rosario: young woman who brings the ironed clothes to Augusto's house.

Orfeo: Augusto's dog.

Domingo: Augusto's house steward.

Liduvina: Augusto's housekeeper.

Ermelinda: Eugenia's aunt.

Margarita: Eugenia's uncles' house caretaker.

== Aesthetic innovation ==
Substantial portions of Mist are dedicated to expounding a new style of novel, of which Mist itself is meant to be an exemplar. The original Spanish subtitle of the book is the neologism "nivola," a slight alteration of the standard Spanish word for "novel" (novela). Unamuno coined this term to emphasize his intentional break with what he saw as the dominant novelistic aesthetic of his time. He explicitly rejected novels with an overabundance of descriptive language and psychological analyses of the characters, and instead he emphasized heavy use of dialogue.

Another aspect of the nivola, according to Unamuno, was its "viviparous" rather than "oviparous" nature. Through the words of the character Victor Goti, Unamuno wrote that the viviparous novel was "born alive" all at once without a plan, and took shape as the author wrote it.

== Critical analysis ==
Literary critics have written myriad studies analyzing the structure and plot of Mist, some of whom (such as Katrine Andersen) note the influences of Kant, Hegel, Spinoza, Schopenhauer and Kierkegaard on the novel. This influence is notable in Augusto's feeling of being lost inside the titular "mist," which prevents him from knowing where he is going or what he should do to give his life purpose. J.A.G. Ardila contends that Mist was inspired by Kierkegaard's work Diary of a Seducer, a novella in Either/Or.

Sergio Arlandis López takes an interest in the novel's theme of the urge for personal salvation in the face of nonexistence, as within that salvation he perceives an element of existential agony in the search for transcendence. Arlandis López also writes on the problematization between reason and faith, about which he says, "I understand that reason itself contradicts the aspiration to immortality, but it is necessary in that it is doubt [...] that pushes us [...] toward the search for knowledge." According to this analysis, the uncertainty surrounding immortality causes the fear of nonexistence "and a renunciation of the consciousness of being-in-the-world in favor of a harmonic reinsertion into Creation."

One of the primary matters on which several critics agree is the theory that Unamuno had a particular style in his writings after a profound crisis of faith that the author experienced in 1897, in which he "wished to 'create' what he did not believe in." Information on Unamuno's crisis of faith is available thanks to the near-complete preservation of his correspondence; his letters to Clarín make constant reference to this process.

Some scholars find that Unamuno tended toward agnosticism and others define him as a complete atheist; despite such disagreement, both camps note that Unamuno attached great importance to the ideas of existence and becoming human. Ana Dotras says that Unamuno spent his entire life vacillating on matters of religious thought, and even that he lived with a certain level of existential dread that he wished to project onto his readers so that they might live with the same doubts.

According to Luis García Jambrilla, the predominant form of criticism of Unamuno's works has been "merely thematic and philosophical readings, fundamentally centered on the problem of personality, existence, and individual identity." Less frequent are those that deal with the autofictional structure of Unamuno's writing; the least common type of critical analysis has dealt with narrative techniques such as metafiction. One of the scholars interested in metafictional study of Mist is Dotras, who writes a detailed analysis of the nivola and demonstrates the characteristics of this form.

Dotras mentions that when Víctor Goti describes the structure of the nivola (which he supposedly creates), two things occur. The first is that he introduces the structure of Mist such that this character can be the spokesman for Unamuno's aesthetic ideas. The second is to generate an unsettling impression on the reader that the book is creating itself; Dotras thus finds that Mist allows the reader to be at once the audience and a cocreator of the text. Dotras relates the critical discussion of the philosophy that exists within the novel to its metafictional function and writes:

Metaphysical conjectures about the relationship between God and his creatures are made by analogy to the relationship between the author-creator and his characters. The human being, as an entity of fiction, is the protagonist of the novel that God writes. The existential dimension is connected in this way with the metafictional, by suggesting the possibility of the fictional nature of human existence, by identifying life with fiction.

— Ana Dotras

== Movie adaptations ==
- Niebla (1965), Spanish Television miniseries directed by Pedro Amalio López.
- Niebla (1976), Spanish Television telefilm directed by Fernando Méndez-Leite.
- Las cuatro novias de Augusto Pérez (1976), Spanish film by José Jara.
