= Carlist war crimes =

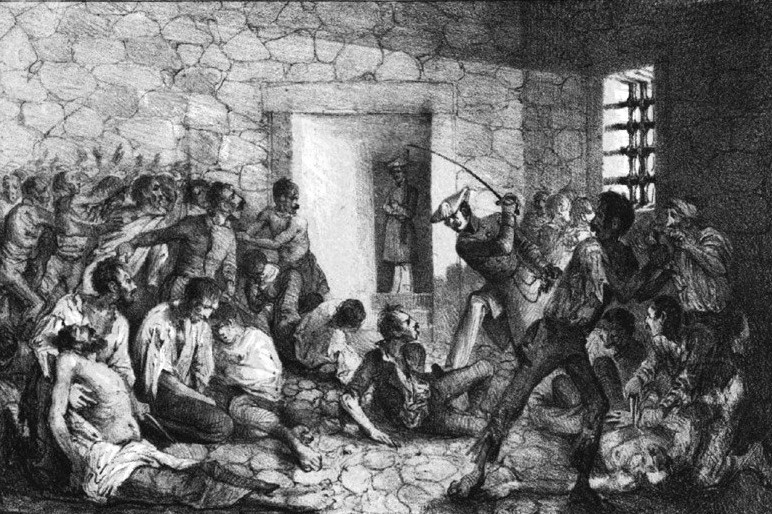
largest Carlist atrocity: Beceite 1837/1838

Throughout almost 200 years of its history Carlism has been known mostly for violent attempts to seize power, contributing to outbreak of 4 civil wars (1833–1840, 1846–1849, 1872–1876, 1936–1939) and to various other, minor armed conflicts. In their course numerous atrocities have been committed by both sides. However, in mainstream Spanish public discourse, especially of the late 19th century, it was the Carlists who became identified with the most barbaric, inhuman, primitive and savage current of national politics. This image persisted well into the 20th century enhanced by great literary works, e.g., those of Pío Baroja. A related blend of history and fiction is epitomized in his 1936 account, when witnessing the Carlists on the rise again, he noted they were "spreading terror just like I have depicted them in my novels". For some Republican officials, the Carlists remained the symbols of horror. During Francoism the theme was played down, and afterwards it lost appeal. Today the issue of Carlist atrocities is related mostly to the last civil war and remains pursued by rather few groups. No scientific monograph on Carlist violence has ever been published.

== First Carlist War (1833–1840) ==
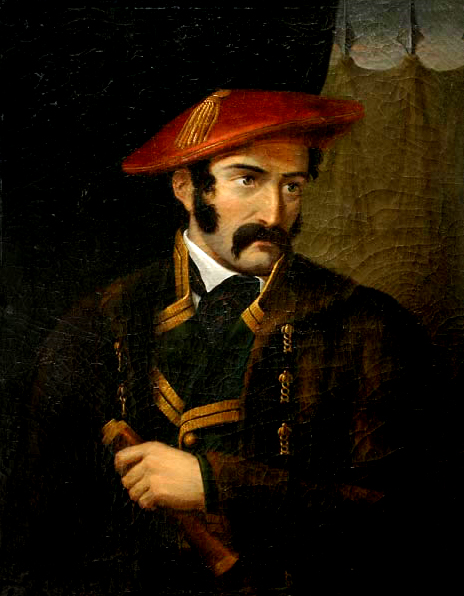
Zumalacárregui

Following outbreak of hostilities the atrocities commenced almost immediately, though usually on small scale; their mechanism is disputed. One theory is that the Cristinos command adopted an assumption that all enemy soldiers were rebels guilty of treason, which was a crime punishable by death; first executions took place already in October 1833. This, in turn - the theory goes - triggered repressive measures on part of the Carlists. The competitive theories are that it was the Carlists who assumed this stand, or that they embarked on wild killing spree because of their innate fanaticism, backwardness and cruelty. One more version is that the Carlists started executing their prisoners because of the nature of warfare they were waging. Initially they operated as highly mobile columns, which made it impossible to keep POWs; faced with the choice of either setting them free or executing them, they opted for the latter. This was first practiced on a large scale in March 1834, when the legitimist troops commanded by Tomás Zumalacárregui laid siege to Vitoria. Once an outpost at the defence perimeter in Gamarra Mayor has been seized, there were over 200 Celadores de Álava soldiers who surrendered. However, as Cristinos relief units were approaching, the Carlists decided to break siege and withdraw. POWs were initially marched along, but two days later Zumalacarregui ordered their execution and confirmed the order when prompted by local commander, who remained somewhat perplexed; death of 118 prisoners became known as fusilamientos de Heredia. Even larger massacre of 163 prisoners from Batallón de Granada took place in Mondragón (January 1835); this time the carnage was prompted by widespread belief that the unit had been responsible for so-called matanza de frailes in 1834. Executing POWs became common practice, affecting also highly positioned individuals; in August 1834 Conde de Via Manuel, grandee of Spain, was shot when taken prisoner.

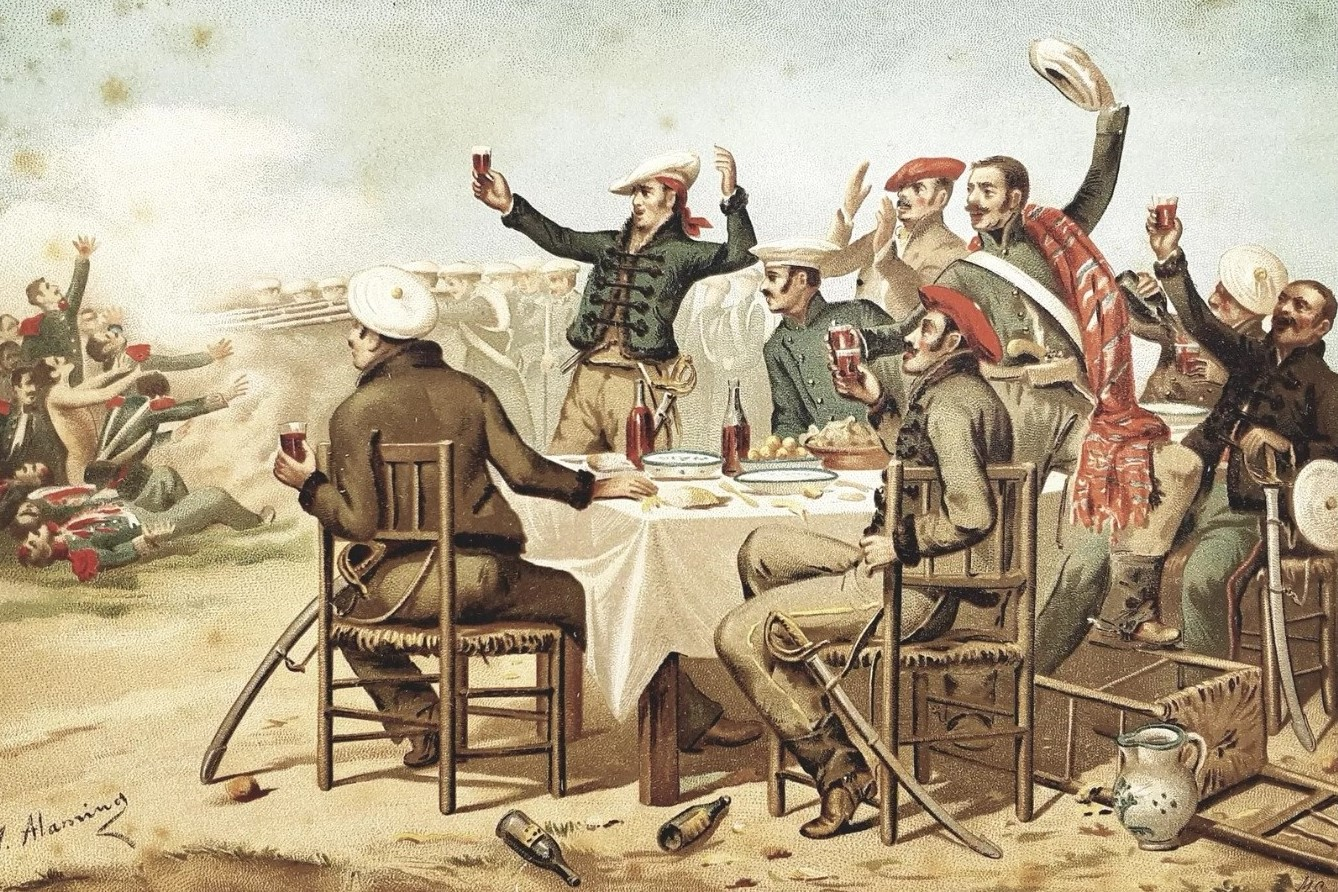
Burjassot (in fact, Paterna): propaganda or reality?

The scale of atrocities prompted foreign intervention, especially that British expeditionary troops were engaged in the war in alliance with the Cristinos. Negotiations climaxed in a so-called Eliot Convention, agreed in April 1835; it somewhat limited the killings, though initially there were controversies whether the convention was applicable to the Basque-Navarrese front only. Despite the agreement Ramón Cabrera, the Carlist commander in Aragón, kept executing small groups of prisoners. His violence affected also civilians, since repressive measures were taken in case of resistance or refusal to cooperate, e.g. to provide fodder, accommodation etc.; Cabrera ordered execution of mayors of a few towns. In revenge and with approval of the highest Cristino commander, his 53-year-old mother was executed in February 1836. Cabrera declared that "rivers of blood will now flow" and indeed, historians mark this moment as "punto de inflexión en la guerra". He then embarked on indiscriminate violence, with largest killings in Alcotas (145 victims, April 1836) and Ulldecona (140 victims, June 1836). Some accounts from 1837 provide the picture of horror orgy, including cheerful Carlist commanders wining and dining while enjoying executions (Burjassot, March 1837), yet the episode is highly dubious. Also local commanders - Joaquín Bosque, Juan Cabañero - were ordering executions. At times Carlist leaders did not explicitly order the killings, but permitted the carnage to happen; this was the case in Andoain (September 1837), when the commanding officer José Ignacio Uranga allowed the infuriated Basque crowd to massacre (mostly with agricultural tools) some 60 British soldiers, taken prisoner few hours earlier.

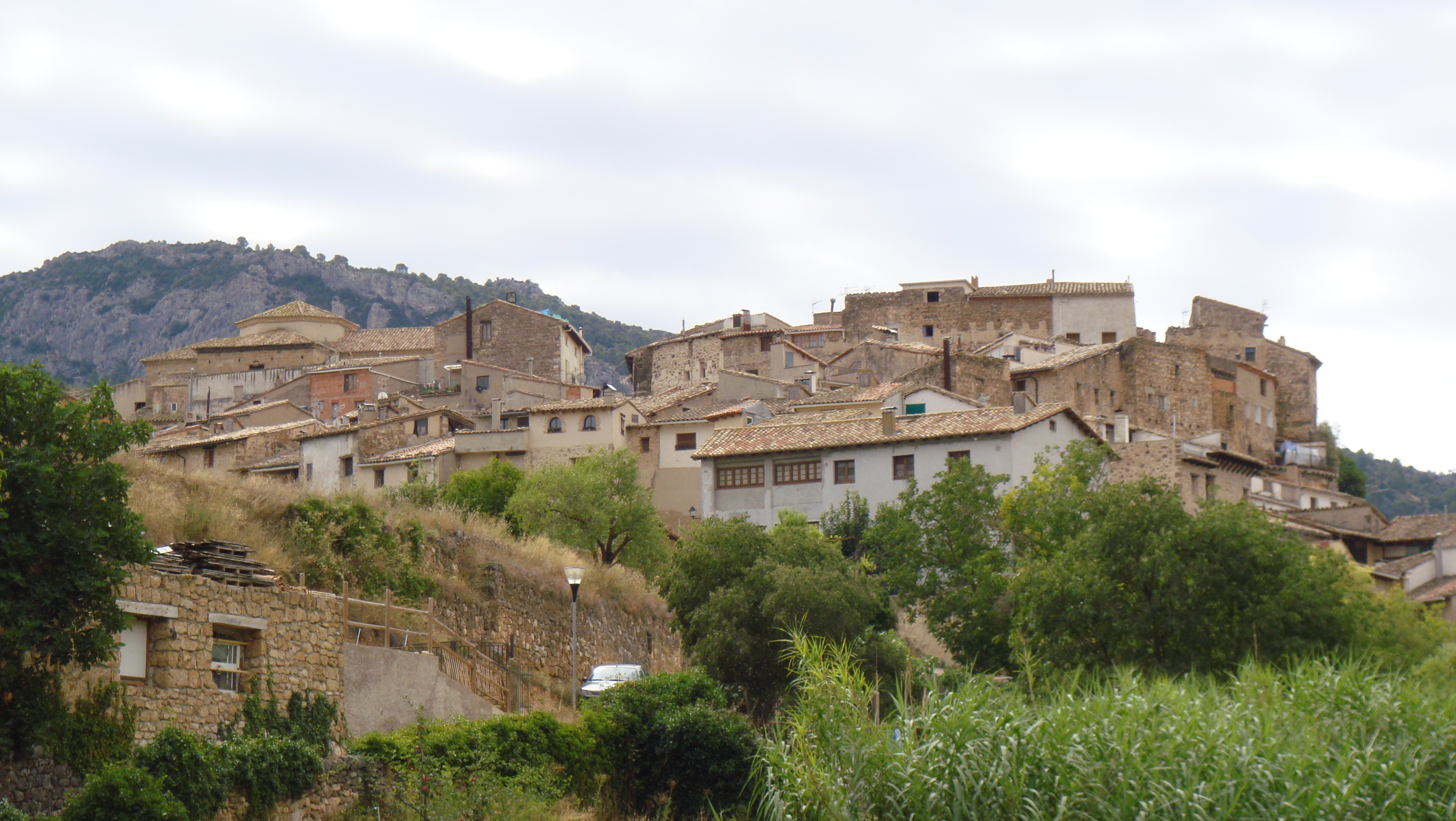
Beceite (present view)

The largest-scale atrocity of the First Carlist War — and the largest one among Carlist war crimes of all the time, including the 20th century ‚ occurred in and around the Aragón town of Beceite during few months between November 1837 and March 1838. Following a fairly successful summer campaign, in the Maestrazgo region the Carlists held some 1,500 prisoners. In atrocious conditions they were marched to Beceite, where sort of an urban prison camp was organized; prisoners were held in various premises, including a derelict castle. Their captors provided very little food and no medical assistance; as winter, usually harsh in this mountainous Teruel province, was setting in, they also provided close to no heating. During months to come hundreds of prisoners perished due to hunger, cold, sickness and mistreatment; there are horror accounts of cannibalism having taken place among the captives. In freezing and snowy winter conditions in February and March the prisoners were marched to some other locations, until the survivors — estimated to be some 15-20% of the original number directed to Beceite - were liberated in a POW exchange. The total number of victims is unknown, yet it might have approached a thousand. No individual personally responsible for the crime has been identified, yet the overall Carlist commander in the area was Cabrera. It is neither clear whether the deaths were intended or whether they resulted rather from chaos, negligence, poor logistics and sort of acceptance of death toll as kind of collateral damage.

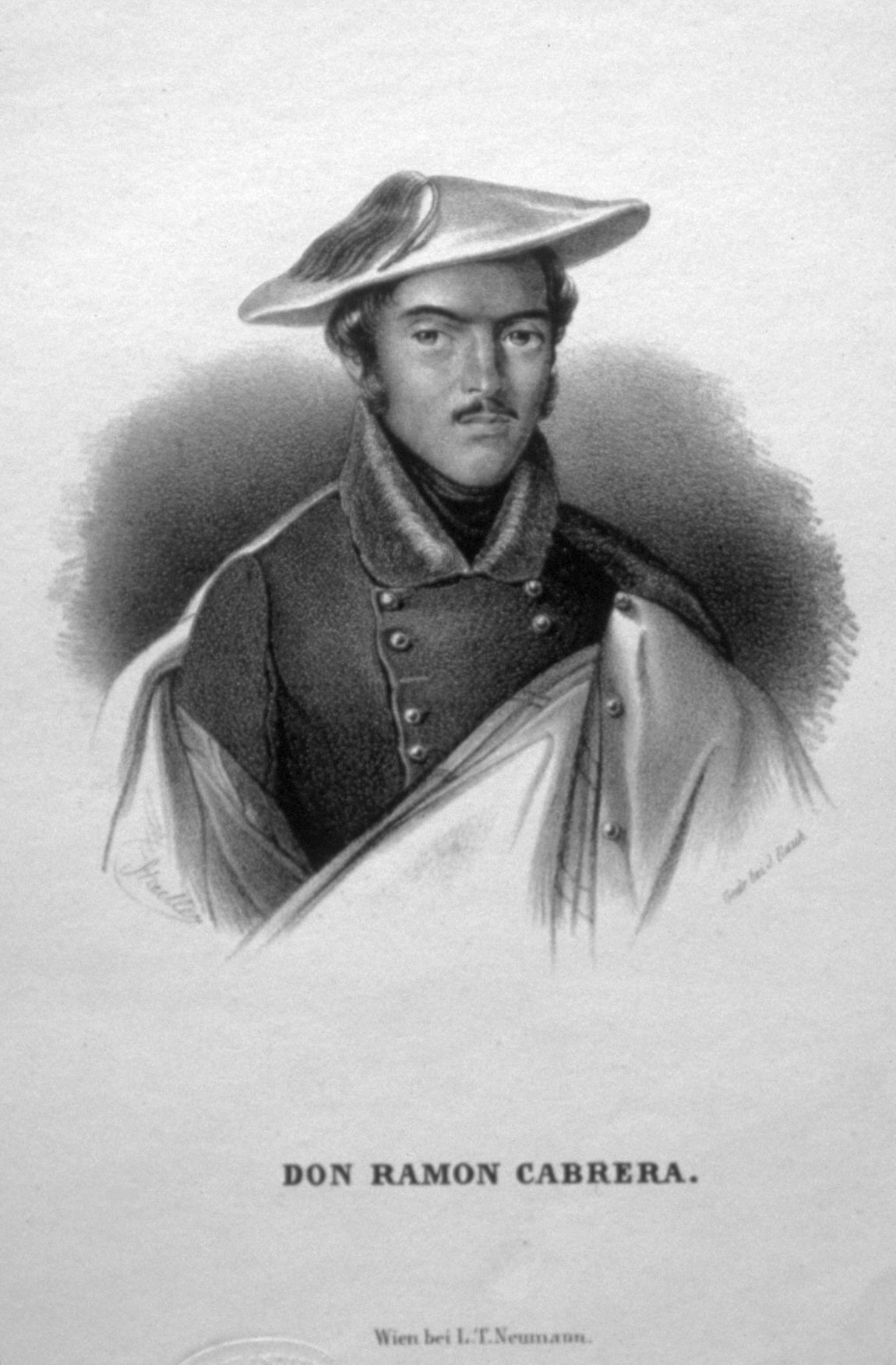
Cabrera

The last 3 years of the conflict also produced numerous atrocities. Again, it was Cabrera emerging as the key protagonist. In October 1838 in 3 separate executions in Maestrazgo on his orders some 250 POWs were shot. In case of Horcajo the crime was somewhat elaborated: 96 NCO captives from different units and held in various locations were first assembled, and then shot. In case of the Villahermosa carnage apart from enemy combatants the victims included children under 12 and the elderly over 70; when combing the town for combatants, the Carlists herded to execution spots whoever they thought might have been even remotely engaged in resistance. Even in relatively calm Galicia one carnage (Boqueixón, September 1838) involved 40 Voluntarios and their families. However, the largest crime took place in La Mancha, in Calzada de Calatrava (February 1838). The defenders took refuge in a massive stone-built local church; the Carlist commander, Basilio Garcia, brought in the artillery and ordered fire. After a few salvos many of the besieged decided to surrender, yet the Carlists kept firing. In the chaotic scene that followed some Cristinos soldiers were asking for pardon, some were trying to flee, and some kept hiding in the church, still pounded by the artillery. The total number of victims can be only estimated, with figures ranging from 150 to 300. Almost similar in scale was the carnage in Moià (October 1839), which stands out for cruelty; tens of civilians and prisoners were killed by having their throats cut. The last large-scale execution, in Bojar, took place in late May 1840, it is few weeks before the end of the conflict (37 prisoners). During final stages of the war increasingly fragmented Carlist commanders were executing own generals (fusilamientos de Estella, February 1839). According to later not necessarily credible calculations by a vehemently anti-Carlist author - yet with underestimated figures in few cases - during the entire war there were 2,843 fatal victims of Carlist executions, mostly in 1836 (819) and 1837 (804), and 54 summary executions with at least 10 victims.

== Third Carlist War (1872–1876) ==
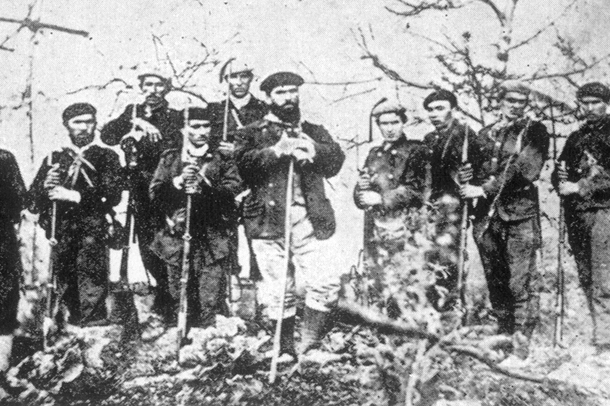
Santa Cruz and his men, 1873

Compared to the war of the 1830s, the civil conflict of the 1870s was fought on a much smaller scale and on a much reduced territory. However, due to growth of the newspaper industry the media coverage was much more extensive. Since mid-1872 the liberal press started printing news on Carlist crimes, including single assassinations of civilians; they were mostly related to various acts of robbery and pillaging. Since early 1873 the person who gained notoriety for cruelty was a Catholic priest leading an autonomous guerilla unit, a Basque named Manuel Santa Cruz, known also simply as El Cura. His actions included single executions and harsh corporal punishment, in both cases administered also against women (e.g. charged with spying), though also against members of his own unit. In June 1873 he raided a control post in a place named Enderlaza, on the road from Pamplona to Irún and at the border between Navarre and Gipuzkoa. Claiming that the defenders had mischievously displayed a white flag to fire at the approaching Carlist soldiers later, Santa Cruz ordered execution of 35 Carabineros who had eventually surrendered. Until that moment and unlike during the First Carlist War, cases of POW killings were rare and rather spontaneous. The Carlist king Carlos VII and his command were anxious to present their cause as Christian, just and high-principled, e.g. following a kangaroo trial and death sentence to 135 liberal defenders of Estella, he pardoned all but 13. Santa Cruz, who acted with much autonomy anyway, was told to back down. He was hesitant to comply and eventually ended up having been hunted by both the Liberals and the Carlists alike; he laid down his arms and crossed to France, never to return to Spain in the future. The monument to honor the executed Enderlaza Carabineros was erected after the war, got destroyed by the Carlists in 1936, and was re-erected during early Francoism.

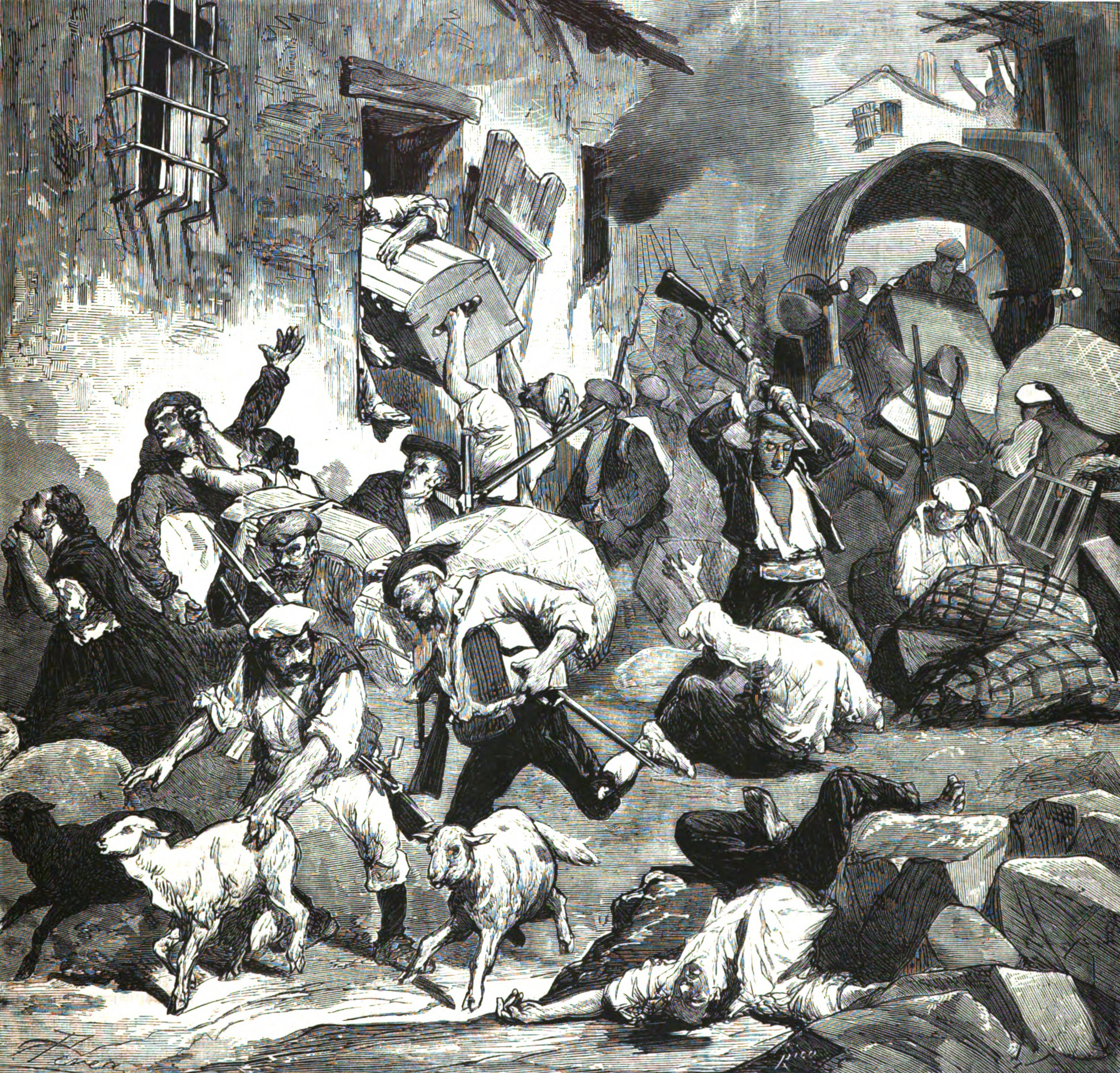
looting of Cuenca, 1874

On the Basque-Navarrese front Carlos VII managed mostly to control his army, though there were exceptions (e.g. in conquered Tolosa 3 women, a mother and wives to Miqueletes, were first paraded half-naked and with heads shaven across the streets, and then shot). It was not the case in Catalonia, where troops were only nominally led by his younger brother, infante Alfonso. Local commanders were waging an increasingly brutal warfare, e.g. Pascual Cúcala had 14 civilian hostages from Sagunto shot in Vall de Uxó. The leader who adopted a particularly merciless stand was a Catalan, Francesc Savalls; since mid-1873 a few times he ordered executions of prisoners, though on a small scale, and was responsible for numerous repressive actions against civilian population. His stance produced first controversy and then open conflict with infante Alfonso. Unable to enforce less unforgiving modus operandi, Alfonso via France reached his brother in order to seek resolution of the conflict. In his absence, in March 1874, Savalls ordered execution of 34 POWs in Besalú. Alfonso was back in Catalonia in the spring, but soon it was him who attracted much attention as a murderous criminal. He was in nominal command of troops which in July 1874 entered Cuenca, one of only 2 cases of a provincial capital seized by the legitimists. During some 72 hours before they withdrew, the city was subject to ruthless pilagging, arson, destruction and violence; some 40 people were killed. Though it appears that victorious soldiers went on rampage in disregard of any command, the ultimate responsibility was clearly with Alfonso. Saco de Cuenca soon became a cause célèbre, as a symbol of right-wing evil comparable to matanza de Badajoz in case of the 1936-1939 war. The Madrid government later lodged with the French a formal extradition request, in press and literature Alfonso and his wife became icons of barbarity, and 57 years later, when assuming the Carlist claim in 1931, he was referred to by Unamuno as "Alfonso, el de Cuenca".

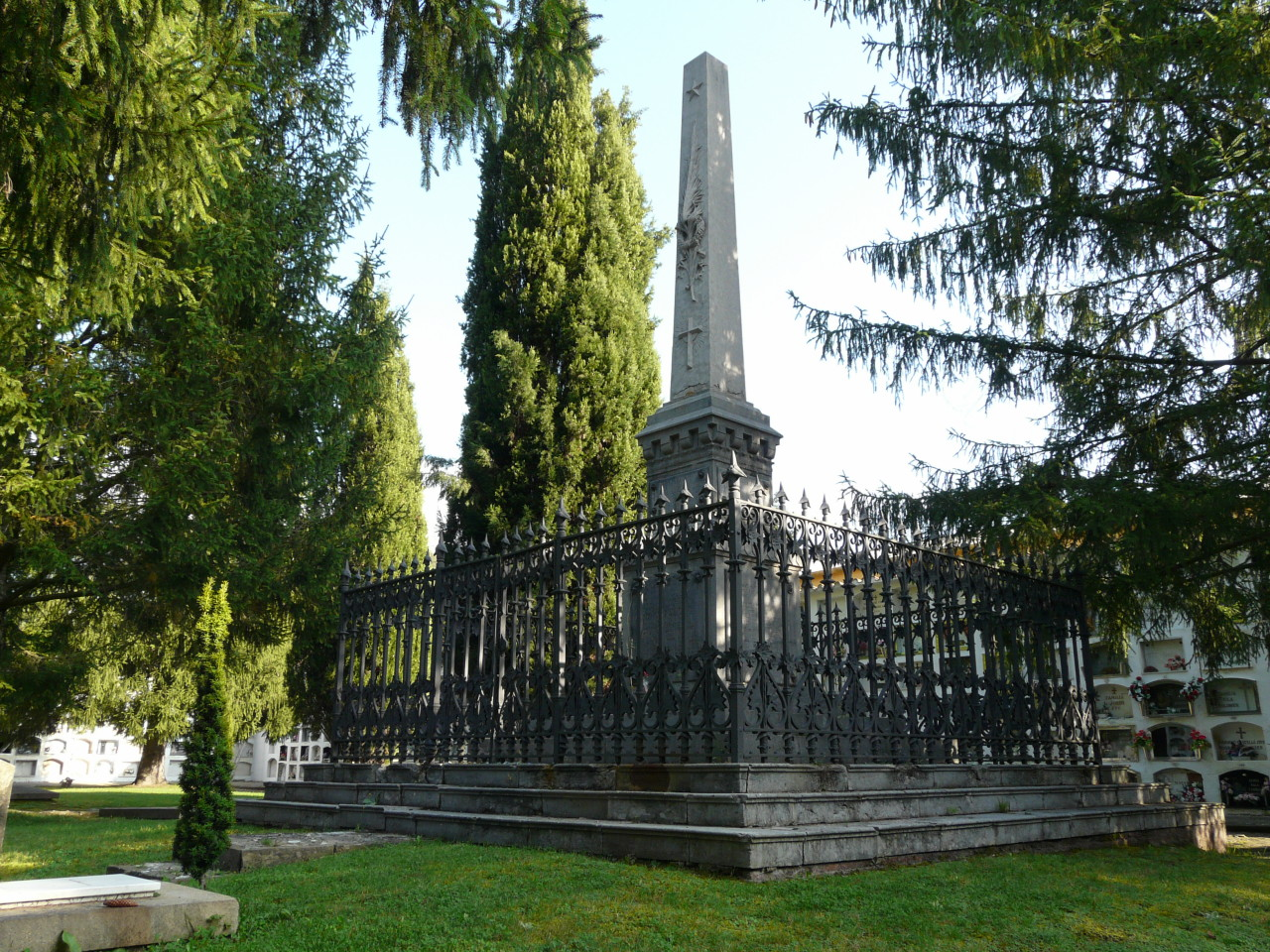
memorial to Sant Joan killings

July 1874 was particularly marked by atrocities; apart from Cuenca, two other large-scale killings occurred this month. The largest one, which turned out to be the most bloody carnage of the war, was again about executing POWs. Savalls was at the time in control of a north-Catalan county of Olot, yet he was threatened by a liberal counter-offensive. Some 200 prisoners, mostly local Carabineros, were tied into pairs are marched, half-naked, most barefoot and with no headgear in blazing mid-summer sun, some 15 km north-east of Olot; they were being executed in groups. The largest bloodbath, of 116 prisoners, took place at the outskirts of the small town of Sant Joan de les Abadesses. A somewhat lesser massacre took place 5 days earlier during assault on an equally small Navarrese town of Cirauqui. Like in Calzada de Calatrava 36 years earlier, the defenders from Voluntarios de la Libertad militia took their last stand in a local church, and like in Calzada, most of them eventually decided to surrender. However, the following story was rather this of Andoain. The commanding officer Antonio Dorregaray departed with most of his troops to Estella, though he was fully aware that the Basque crowd shouted for the heads of all the prisoners (during previous 14 months when in control, Voluntarios mistreated locals, including women). The sub-unit left theoretically to guard the prisoners were equally bent on revenge. When the sun set, 42 militiamen were dead and 3 would die from their wounds in the following hours. In both cases, "Martyrs of Llaes" and "Martyrs of Cirauqui" would be later commemorated for decades to come.

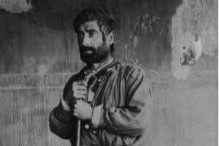
Jergón, 1876

In 1875-1876 the number of killings went down, perhaps because the Carlist-held territory was reduced to small enclaves in Vasconagadas-Navarre and in Catalonia. Except 10 POWs having been executed in the Navarrese Lodosa (June 1875) there was no other case of killing more than few prisoners or civilians. According to a vehemently hostile anti-Carlist propagandist, during the Third Carlist War there were 1,193 fatal victims of Carlist atrocities, some 75% of them (895) killed in the year of 1874; the number of summary executions (Carlist only) with at least 10 victims was 12. Shortly after the triumph of the Madrid government, a particular appendix to the history of wartime atrocities has been written. In March 1876 in a tavern in the Navarrese town of Los Arcos the locals recognized among customers a man, supposed to have been member of one of the most atrocious Carlist guerilla groups, led by Felix Domingo Rosa Samaniego. The man turned out to be Ezequiel Lorente Aguerri, a 1841-born Basque from Tudela and a jornalero before the conflict broke out. During the war he took part in numerous combat and repressive actions and became notorious by his alias of Jergón; he boasted of having single-handedly killed 200 people (many thrown, some alive, into a natural 50-metre-deep pit, known as "sima de Igúzquiza"). No professional historian has ever ventured to verify this claim; if true, Jergón would have been the most blood-stained Carlist in history. He was captured, trialed and executed shortly afterwards.

== Spanish Civil War (1936–1939) ==
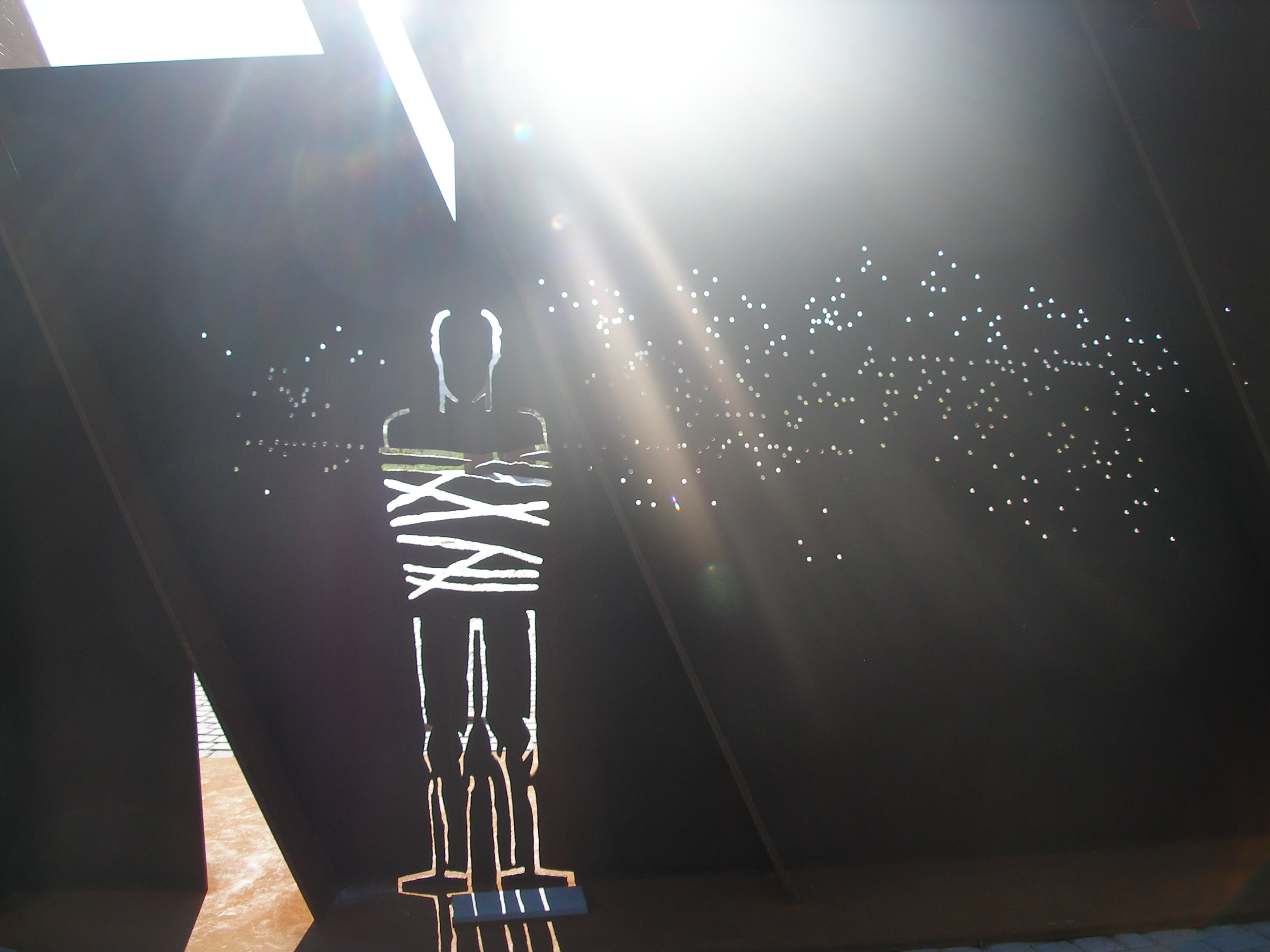
monument to victims of Nationalist terror, Navarre

Along combat engagements, during the Civil War the Carlist militia requeté were taking part in repression. At times various tercios or other frontline units were assigned related tasks in their zones of deployment, e.g. in Cantabria, Aragón, Extremadura or Andalucia. They were usually performed on temporary and makeshift basis; in some sources these measures are referred as "policing", in other they are noted as part of "political cleansing". However, Traditionalist militia are best known for repressive measures executed in areas where Carlism remained a major or significant political force, notably in Navarre and Vasconagadas. In these regions requetés formed major and fixed part of the Nationalist system of institutionalized terror, aimed against political enemies; some scholars list them as one of 4 agents of violence. Their exact role remains disputed. According to one theory, requeté units executed repressive actions which had been planned and approved beforehand by the military; the competitive one claims that at least until late 1936, requeté "death squads" acted independently and with full autonomy.

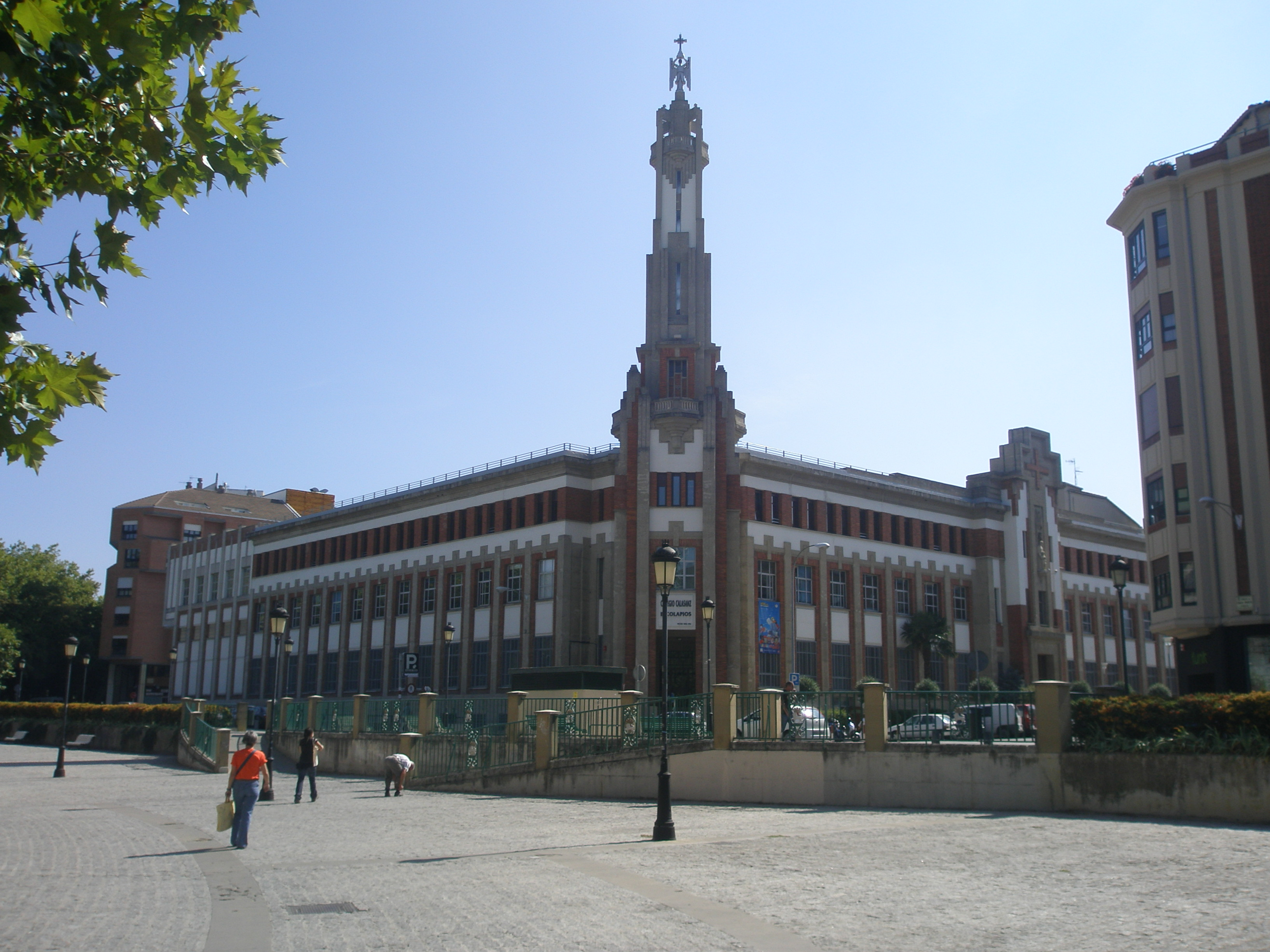
Escolapios, Carlist Pamplona prison

The only province where requeté operated an entire system of terror was Navarre. It was supervised and at times directed by the local Carlist political executive, Junta Central Carlista. The system consisted of 1) requeté running an intelligence network; 2) a specialized branch busy with arrests, terror raids and on-the-spot executions; 3) two Carlist-only prisons - Colegio de los Escolapios and Colegio de los Salesianos in Pamplona, which served as places of detention, interrogation, torture, and execution; 4) filtering bodies which marked inmates for execution, further incarceration or liberation; and 5) death squads which extracted prisoners and shot them later on. Some of these structures were replicated in Vascongadas, especially in Gipuzkoa and Álava; though in these provinces there were only makeshift Carlist-operated prisons, requeté organisation included similar units dedicated to policing and repression tasks, euphemistically named "auxiliary services".

The key branch entrusted with repressive measures was Requeté Auxiliar. The service grouped individuals too young or too old to qualify for regular combat units, though also other volunteers and these released from frontline troops due to wounds suffered. They were assigned numerous rearguard tasks, like postal censorship, manning convoys, gendarmerie duties, grave-digging, liaison, medical services etc., though they were primarily busy with repression; some of their informal units, like Tercio Móvil or Partida Volante, gained notoriety as excelling in terror missions. Fully supervised by Junta Central, requeté members were also delegated to regular police structures in Comisaría de Investigación y Vigilancia, the key police branch busy with pursuit of presumed political enemies, or in Delegación de Orden Público; some of them later grew to major positions. Over time requeté death squads developed their own modus operandi; first detailed information on presumed enemies was collected by local informers, but a unit which performed repressive action in a given area originated from another location to ensure personal relations do not prevent ruthless and no-mercy attitude. The area subjected to particularly heavy requeté terror was part of Navarre, Àlava and Rioja known as Ribera; officially known as "pacificación", in more blunt statements it was referred as "persecución y captura" of political opponents.

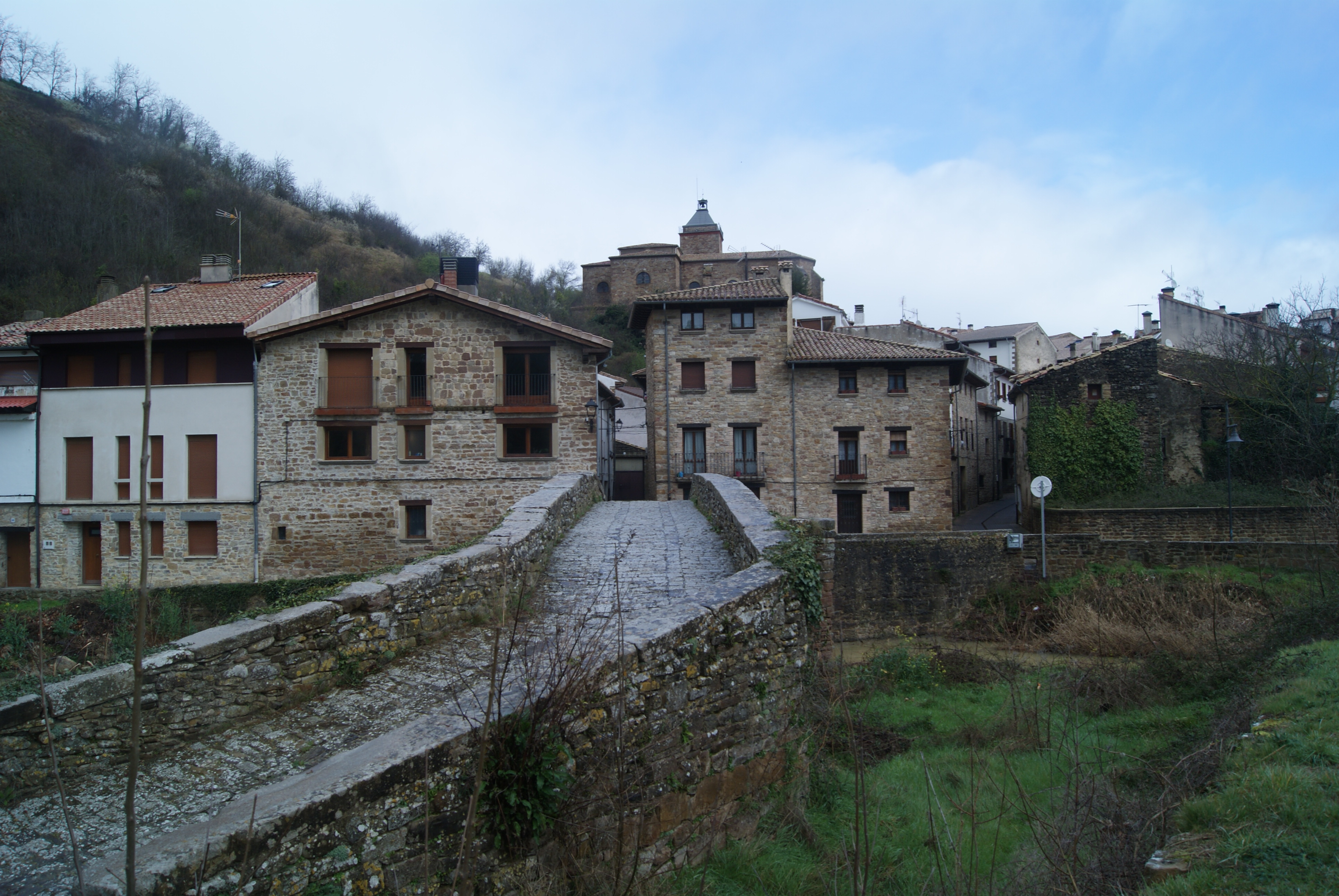
Monreal

The largest single atrocity involving requeté occurred on October 21, 1936, in the Navarrese village of Monreal. Once an attempt to raid a Tafalla prison and lynch the inmates failed due to rigid stand of local Guardia Civil, the assailants obtained an official authorisation. Three days later they extracted 65 prisoners and shot them; the entire operation, including the execution itself, was performed by requetés of Tercio Móvil. The second in terms of scale comes a so-called Valcardera Massacre of August 23, 1936, which produced 52 dead; it is usually noted that requetés who shot the inmates hurried back to Pamplona to take part in a religious ceremony ongoing. The crime which gained particular attention, though, was execution of 8 Basque Catholic priests in the Gipuzkoan town of Hernani and further 4 in Oiartzun in the fall of 1936. In both cases requetés formed part of firing squads and some authors claim that the killings were "carried out at the behest of the Carlists"; the massacre produced an intervention of the papal nuncio and damaged relations between the Nationalists and Vatican. Requeté violence was denounced also by the bishop of Pamplona, Marcelino Olaechea. Many atrocities and crimes committed by requeté members are still under investigation. Some of them involved "barbaric excesses".

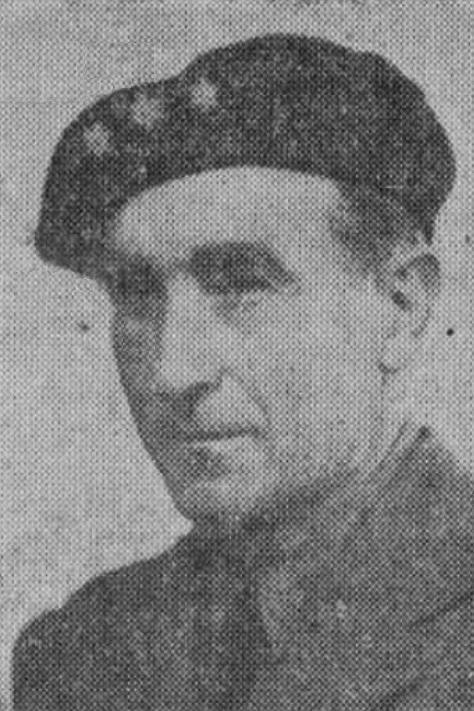
Esteban Ezcurra

In terms of personal responsibility for requeté crimes and atrocities much of it lies with Esteban Ezcurra Arraiza, jefe de Requetés de Navarra. In this role he was responsible for all repressive actions performed by the militia in the province; apart from administrative duties and co-operation with military and official repressive structures, he was also personally involved in issuing detention orders and reviewing the list of inmates. However, the role of "executive arms" was assumed by Benito Santesteban Martínez and Vicente Munárriz Sanz de Arellano, both requeté lieutenants; they were personally ordering detentions, interrogating prisoners, commanding extractions and supervising executions. They were matched if not surpassed by the Requeté Auxiliar teniente from Àlava, Bruno Ruiz de Apodaca Juarrero, who apart from commanding numerous terror raids, boasted also of having personally killed 108 people. Many other requeté members enjoyed murder and looting; some of them reportedly volunteered specifically "to execute the enemies detained". Some accounts of unclear credibility deliver picture of extreme torture and tormenting of inmates before execution. There are authors who claim that even the Carlist political executive were shocked at "the extent of the killings" and tried to limit the terror inflicted by own forces, though mostly in vain.

The scale of carnage inflicted by the Carlists remains uncertain and no general quantification of requeté terror is available, though there is abundant evidence of requeté members taking part in repressive actions. In Navarre only there were some 3,000 people executed in course of the Nationalist terror, yet no source attempts to calculate what is the ratio the Carlists were responsible for. In absence of any documentation, it is not possible to say how many people were held in the Escolapios and how many of them were later murdered by requeté members. Some scholars split the responsibility for crimes and atrocities between the Carlists, the Falangists, the military and anonymous local mob, but other authors claim that requetés formed the "most bloody section of the Nationalist faction" and excelled in political cleansing, be it in Navarre or in Andalusia.

== Annex: largest atrocities (1833–1939) ==
date	conflict	location	number of victims	commander responsible	details
1837/1838 (winter)	First Carlist War	Beceite	900	Ramón Cabrera	POWs marched and held captive, died of hunger, cold and mistreatment
1835.01.08	First Carlist War	Mondragón	163	Francisco Eraso	POWs executed were from a unit suspected of massacring the religious in Madrid in 1834
1838.02.27	First Carlist War	Calzada de Calatrava	150	Basilio Garcia	killed when trying to flee a building under siege (many surrendering)
1839.10.09	First Carlist War	Moia	150	Carlos de España	including civilians, children and women; many had their throats cut
1836.04.18	First Carlist War	Alcotas	145	Ramón Cabrera	POWs executed
1836.06.16	First Carlist War	Ulldecona	140	Ramón Cabrera	POWs executed
1834.03.17	First Carlist War	Heredia	118	Tomás Zumalacárregui	POWs executed
1874.07.17	Third Carlist War	Sant Joan de les Abadesses	116	Francisco Savalls	POWs executed; part of larger killings in and around Olot in late July
1838.10.01	First Carlist War	Maella	102	Ramón Cabrera	POWs executed, including wounded extracted from the local field hospital
1837.10.14	First Carlist War	Camarillas	92	Juan Cabañero	POWs executed
1838.10.20	First Carlist War	Horcajo	96	Ramón Cabrera	POWs, mostly NCOs from different units held captive, executed
1837.05.03	First Carlist War	San Mateo	75	Ramón Cabrera	POWs executed
1836.10.20	First Carlist War	Albentosa	73	José Lorente	POWs executed, including some accompanying family members (including a child)
1873.03.27	Third Carlist War	Berga	67	Francisco Savalls	POWs and civil officials executed
1838.10.27	First Carlist War	Villahermosa	65	Ramón Cabrera	POWs executed, including children under 12 and men over 70
1835.09.12	First Carlist War	Nogueruelas	65	Ramón Cabrera	POWs and civilians from Rubielos de Mora, executed
1936.10.21	Civil War 1936-1939	Monreal	65	Esteban Ezcurra	inmates extracted from Tafalla prison, mostly civilians, executed
1837.09.14	First Carlist War	Andoain	60	José Ignacio Uranga	POWs, mostly British, executed or permitted to by lynched by the crowd
1936.08.23	Civil War 1936-1939	Valcaldera	52	Esteban Ezcurra	inmates extracted from Pamplona prison, mostly civilians, executed
1838.07.30	First Carlist War	Ballestar	50	unclear	POWs and civilians executed
1835.07.05	First Carlist War	La Yesa	46	Ramón Cabrera	POWs executed
1836.05.30	First Carlist War	Bañón	45	Joaquín Quílez	POWs executed
1837.03.30	First Carlist War	Paterna	42	Ramón Cabrera	officers and NCOs taken POW, executed
1837.10.05	First Carlist War	Argente	41	Joaquín Bosque	POWs executed
1874.07.15-16	Third Carlist War	Cuenca	40	Alfonso Carlos de Borbón	killed as POWs or (also civilians) during looting of the city
1873.12.22	Third Carlist War	Gilet	40	Pascual Cucala	hostages taken in Sagunto, mostly civilians, executed
1837.10.04	First Carlist War	Villafranca	40	Ramón Cabrera	POWs executed
1834.04.06	First Carlist War	Móra d'Ebre	40	Manuel Carnicer	POWs executed
1838.09.08	First Carlist War	Boqueixón	40	Ramón Ramos	POWs executed, including family members
1837.09.27	First Carlist War	Tarazona	37	Joaquín Bosque	POWs executed
1840.05.26	First Carlist War	Bojar	37	Ramón Cabrera	POWs executed
1874.07.12	Third Carlist War	Cirauqui	36	Antonio Dorregaray	liberal volunteers taken POW, permitted to be lynched by the crowd
1873.06.04	Third Carlist War	Enderlaza	34	Manuel Santa Cruz	Carabineros taken POW, executed
1874.03.19	Third Carlist War	Besalú	34	Francisco Savalls	POWs executed

== See also ==
- Carlism
