= María Rafols Bruna =

Spanish nun (1781-1853)

Blessed María Rafols Bruna
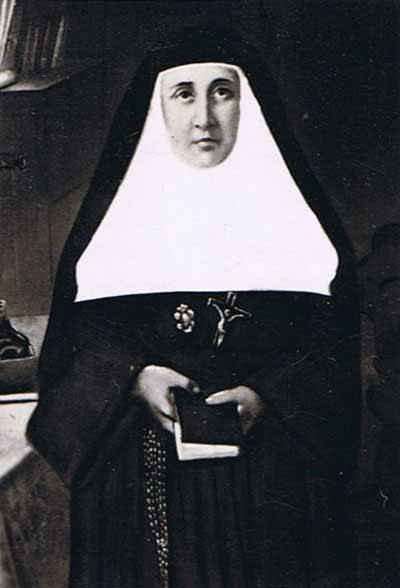
- Devotional print c. 1880.

Religious and Foundress
- Born: 5 November 1781; Vilafranca del Penedès, Barcelona, Kingdom of Spain
- Died: 30 August 1853 (aged 71); Zaragoza, Kingdom of Spain
- Venerated in: Roman Catholic Church
- Beatified: 16 October 1994, Saint Peter's Square, Vatican City by Pope John Paul II
- Feast: 30 August
- Attributes: Religious habit
- Patronage: Sisters of Charity of Saint Anne; Nurses

María Rafols Bruna (5 November 1781 – 30 August 1853) was a Spanish Roman Catholic nun, mystic and the co-founder of the Congregation of the Sisters of Charity of Saint Anne that she established alongside the Catholic priest Juan Bonal Cortada. María Rafols dedicated her entire life to the care of the ill working in hospitals in Zaragoza and during times of war risked her life to aid others. Internal complications and a range of outside interferences saw María Rafols be appointed to and resign from various leadership positions and she was captured – though later released – during the Carlist War.

María Rafols was considered a saint after her death which led to the commencement of her canonization cause under Pope Pius XI on 6 August 1931 while being titled as Venerable under Pope John Paul II in 1991 who also beatified her on 16 October 1994 at Saint Peter's Square.

== Life ==
María Rafols Bruna was born in Barcelona on 5 November 1781 as the sixth of ten children to the middle-class Cristóbal Rafols Cunillera and Margarita Bruna Brugol. Her father found work as a miller.

In May 1873 she and her relations relocated to La Bleda where – on 27 May 1785 – she received the sacrament of Confirmation from the Carmelite Bishop of Barcelona Gabino Valladares. Bruna completed her education at a boarding school in Barcelona. In 1792 she moved once again to the town of Santa Margherita where her little brother Juan died in 1793 – five siblings of hers died sometime in their childhoods – while two uncles died sometime between 1793 and 1794. Her father died on 10 July 1794.

María Rafols later joined a group of twelve women placed under the direction of Juan Bonal Cortada who administered in a small Zaragoza hospital and arrived there in December 1804 to the hospital of Nuestra Señora de Gracia. The group dedicated itself to children who were abandoned as well as the disabled and those with mental conditions. She helped Cortada mold that small group into a religious order that she helped him to co-found on 28 December 1804. In 1806 she became the Mother Superior – a position that often put her into conflict with the hospital workers.

During the Napoleonic Wars she worked in the bombed ruins in order to save children and to tend to ill people. On 4 August 1808 the hospital the sisters were working in was bombed so the group had to take refuge elsewhere. The French withdrew on 14 August 1808 but later began another siege on 10 December 1808. Bruna even ventured into the French camp after the second bombing hit in order to plead with General Jean Lannes for his help in tending to the ill and the wounded. Bruna resigned as president of the hospital's board on 12 November 1811 and then made a trip to Orcajo in Daroca. She became superior once more on 10 August 1812 after a new constitution for the order came into effect though she was later forced to resign after internal difficulties. She was later appointed once again as superior and held that from 1826 until 1829.

María Rafols – alongside other women - made her vows into their order on 16 July 1825.

The outbreak of the Carlist War saw her arrested on 11 May 1834 on the charge of acting against Queen Isabel II of Spain and was imprisoned and exiled in Huesca. But after a period of imprisonment – where she met Dominican friars – she was later released on 11 May 1835. María Rafols was later allowed to return to Zaragoza in 1841 after being confined in exile in her hometown since her release and in 1845 asked to retire though continued to still pursue the order's work.

The religious order received papal approval from Pope Leo XIII on 14 January 1898 after providing the congregation with the decree of praise on 13 April 1889. The religious order's constitutions received initial approval in 1883 and then went on to receive the full papal approval of Pope Pius X on 11 March 1904.

== Beatification ==
The beatification process commenced in Zaragoza in an informative process that Archbishop Rigoberto Doménech Valls inaugurated on 1 July 1926 and later closed on 28 January 1927 after the process finished its business. Theologians then collated her writings in order to examine whether or not such spiritual writings were orthodox in nature – the theologians issued their approval to them on 30 March 1931. The apostolic process would span from 30 May 1932 until its closure on 21 May 1934. The Congregation of Rites later validated these previous processes on 26 June 1940.

The formal introduction to the cause came on 6 August 1931 under Pope Pius XI, granting Rafols the title of Servant of God.

In 1944 the cause was suspended under Pope Pius XII for unknown reasons though Pope John Paul II authorized the cause's resumption in 1980. The postulation was then able to submit the Positio to the Congregation for the Causes of Saints in 1989 for their assessment and led to the approval of the cause from a team of theologians on 9 November 1990. The C.C.S. then met and approved the dossier's contents on 6 July 1991. John Paul II proclaimed her to be Venerable on 6 July 1991 after confirming that María Rafols had led a life of heroic virtue.

The miracle required for beatification was investigated in the diocese of its origin and received C.C.S. validation in Rome on 3 December 1992. A medical board approved the healing to be a miracle on 12 February 1993 while theologians likewise came to the same conclusion on 23 April 1993. The cardinal and bishop members of the C.C.S. followed suit on 22 June 1993 and passed it to the pope on 6 July 1993 for his final approval. John Paul II beatified Mother María Rafols in Saint Peter's Square on 16 October 1994.
