= Santed =

Coordinates: 41°02′N 1°30′W

- municipality
- Flag Coat of arms
- Interactive map of Santed
- Country: Spain
- Autonomous community: Aragon
- Province: Zaragoza

Area
  - Total: 17 km^{2} (6.6 sq mi)

Population (2025-01-01)
  - Total: 72
  - Density: 4.2/km^{2} (11/sq mi)
- Time zone: UTC+1 (CET)
  - Summer (DST): UTC+2 (CEST)

Santed is a municipality located in the province of Zaragoza, Aragon, Spain. According to the 2004 census (INE), the municipality has a population of 75 inhabitants.

The town is located near the Sierra de Santa Cruz.

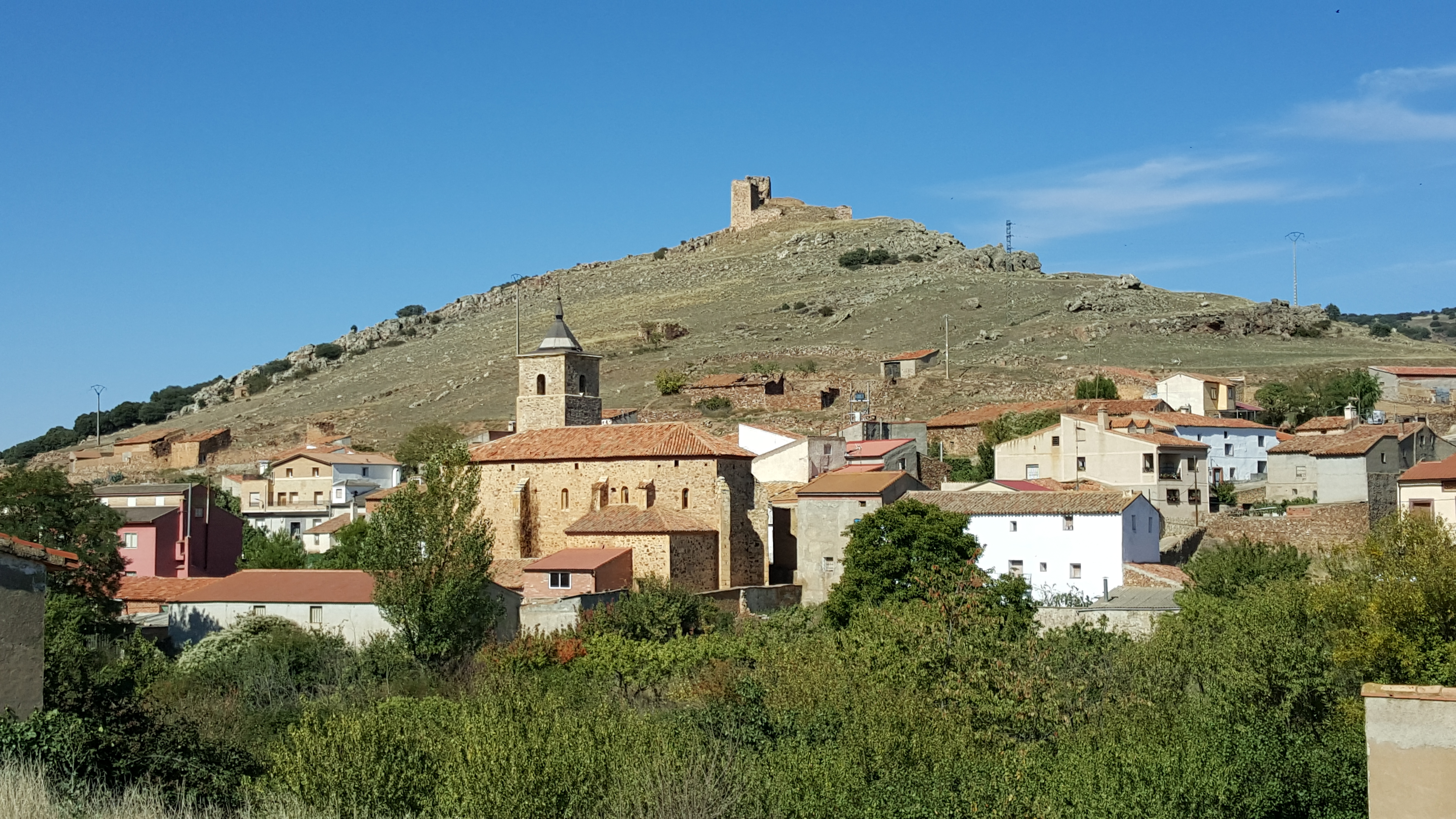
View of Santed, Zaragoza, Spain

== See also ==
- List of municipalities in Zaragoza
