= Val de San Martín =

Coordinates: 41°03′N 1°27′W

- Flag Coat of arms
- Interactive map of Val de San Martín
- Country: Spain
- Autonomous community: Aragon
- Province: Zaragoza
- Municipality: Val de San Martín

Area
  - Total: 25 km^{2} (9.7 sq mi)

Population (2025-01-01)
  - Total: 55
  - Density: 2.2/km^{2} (5.7/sq mi)
- Time zone: UTC+1 (CET)
  - Summer (DST): UTC+2 (CEST)

Val de San Martín is a municipality located in the province of Zaragoza, Aragon, Spain. According to the 2004 census (INE), the municipality has a population of 84 inhabitants. The town is located near the Sierra de Santa Cruz.

The Cerro de San Quílez is the most popular in the municipality and offers views from 1300 meters in altitude.

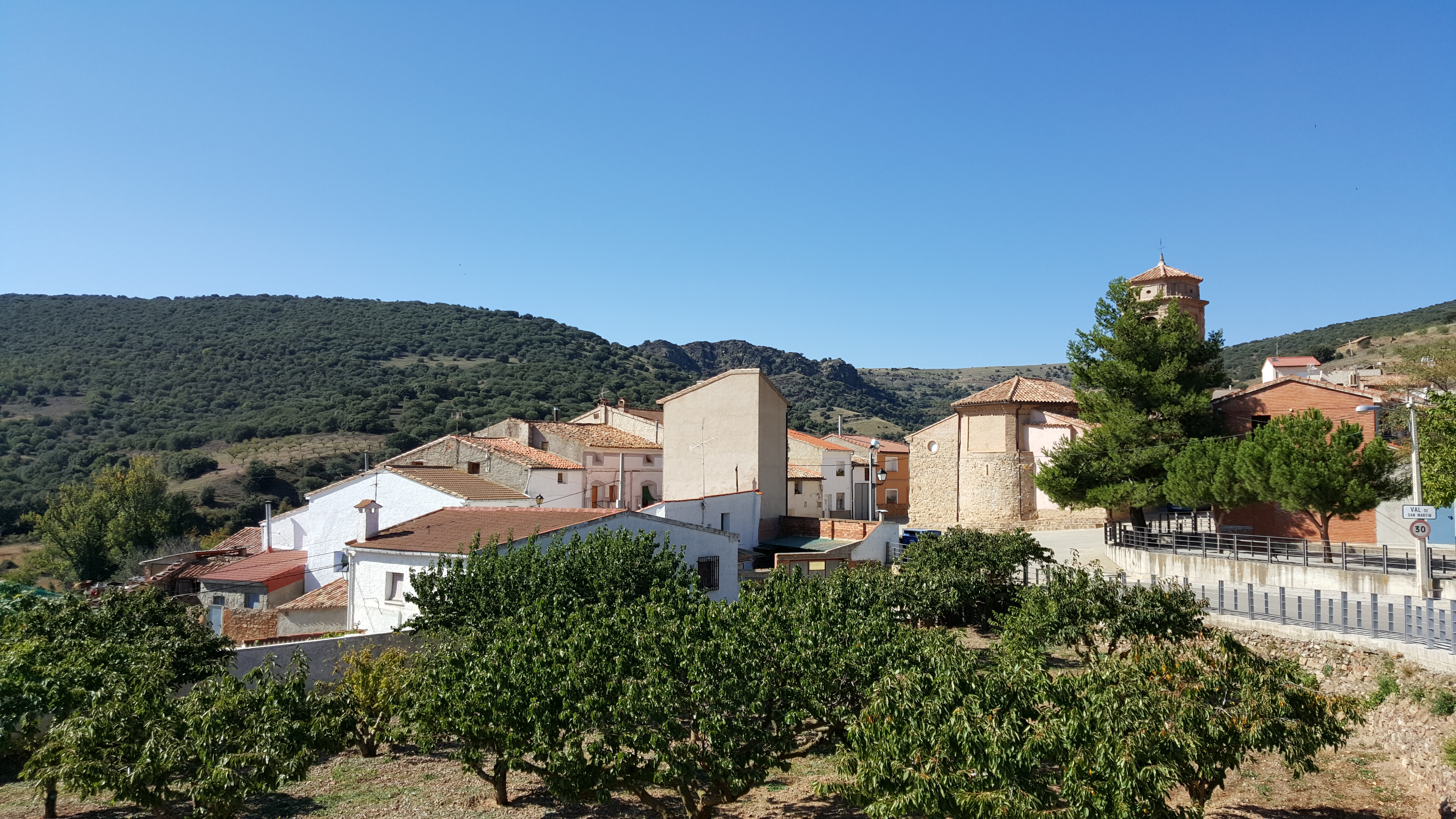
View of Val de San Martín, Zaragoza, Spain

== See also ==
- List of municipalities in Zaragoza
