= Sierra de Santa Cruz, Aragon =

Mountain range in Spain

Sierra de Santa Cruz
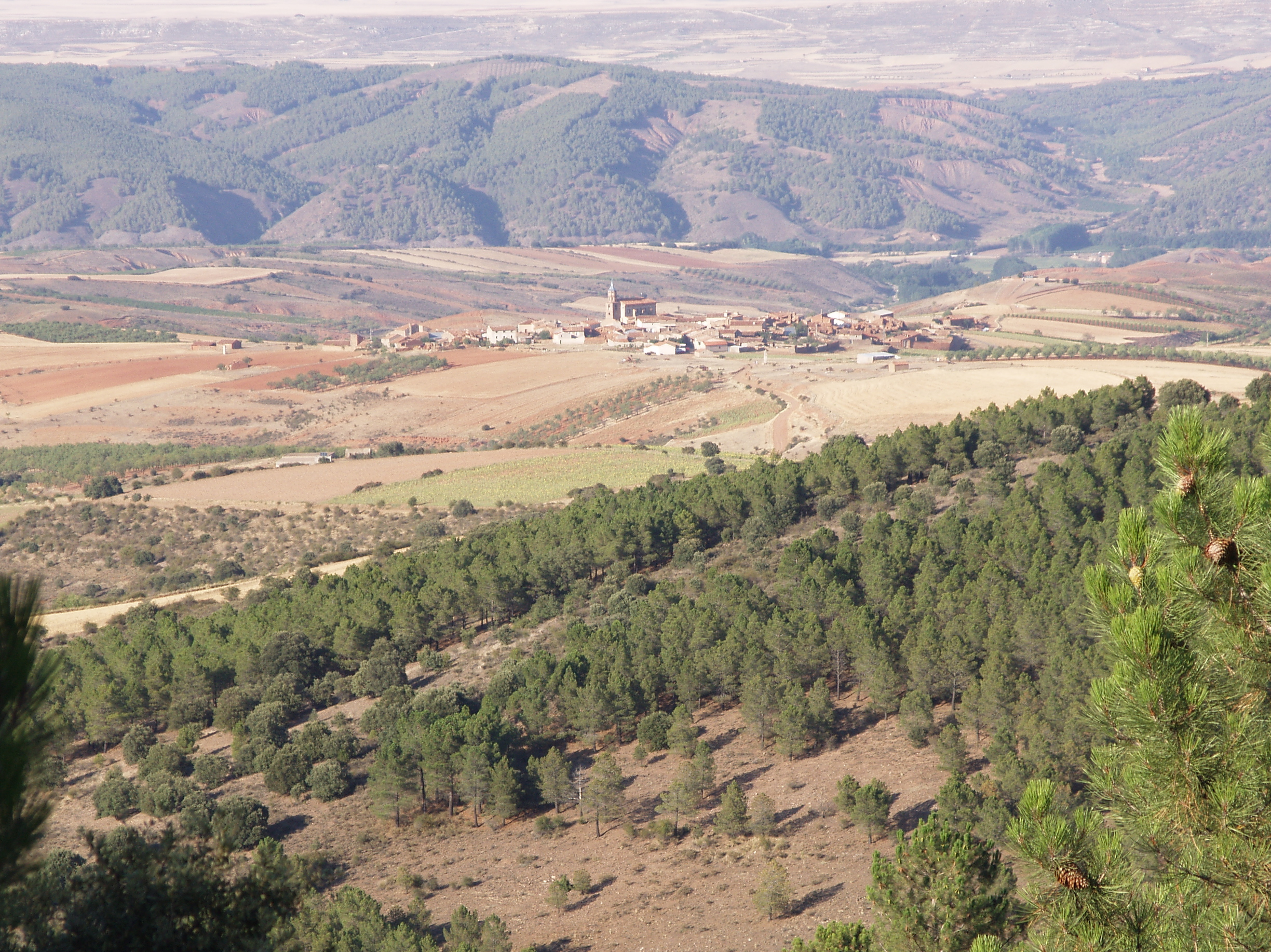
- Sierra de Santa Cruz near Orcajo

Highest point
- Peak: Cerro de Santa Cruz
- Elevation: 1,423 m (4,669 ft)
- Listing: List of mountains in Aragon
- Coordinates: 41°06′15″N 01°33′55″W

Geography
- Location within Spain
- Location: Campo de Daroca (Aragon)
- Parent range: Iberian System

Geology
- Orogeny: Alpine orogeny

Climbing
- First ascent: Unknown
- Easiest route: Drive from Orcajo or Cubel

Sierra de Santa Cruz is a mountain range in the Campo de Daroca comarca, Aragon, Spain. It is located north of the Laguna de Gallocanta.

== Geography ==
The ridge is aligned in a NW-SE direction. Its highest point is Cerro de Santa Cruz (1,423 m). The Ermita de Santa Cruz shrine is located in the range.

This mountain chain rises west of Daroca and stretches through the municipal terms of Balconchán, Atea, Orcajo, Cubel, Valdehorna, Val de San Martín and Santed.

== Ecology ==
The plant Centaurea pinnata is an endangered species present in this mountain range.

== See also ==
- Mountains of Aragon
- Campo de Daroca
