= Balconchán =

Balconchán, Spain
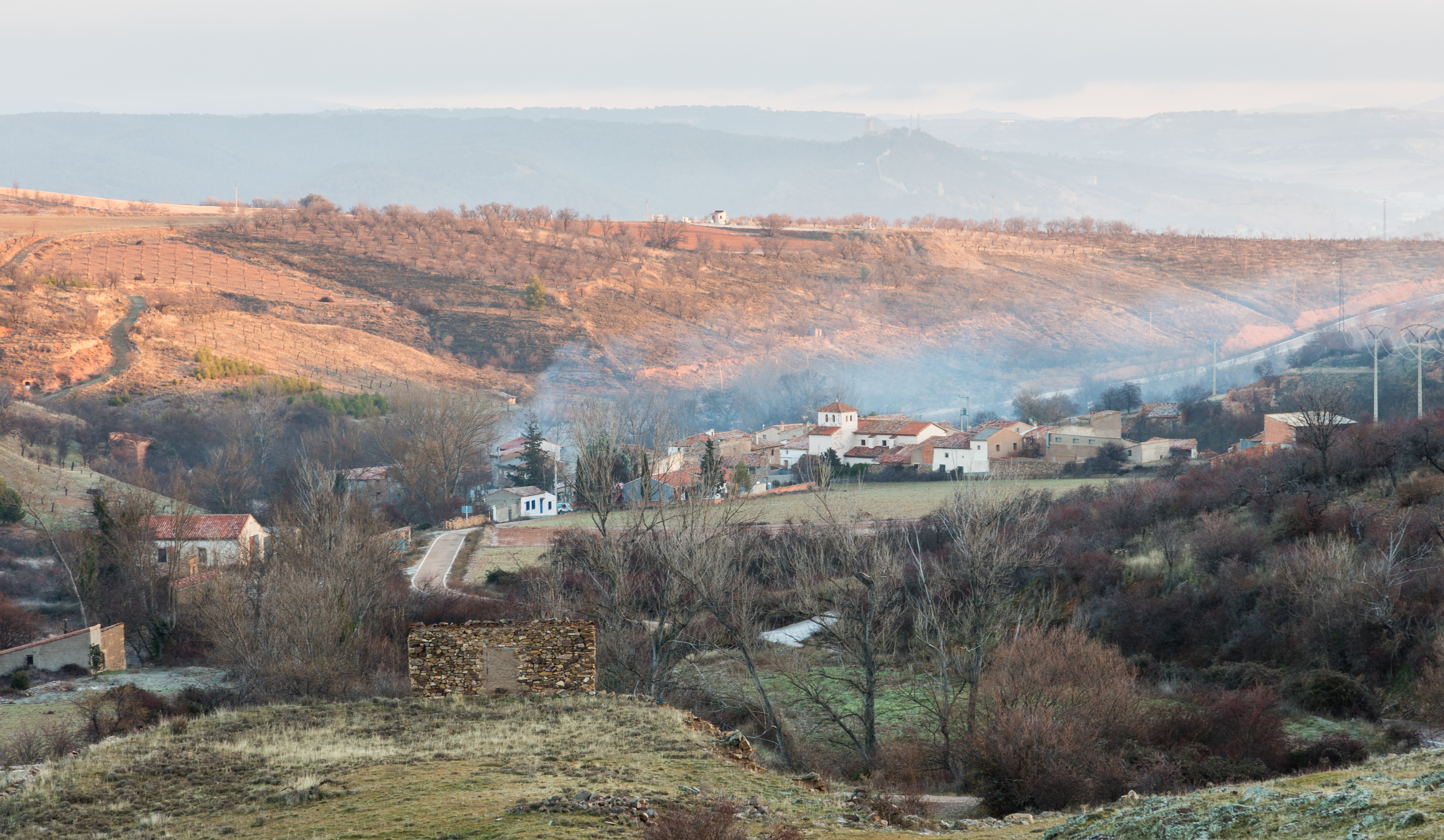

- Flag Coat of arms

- Location within Aragon Location within Spain Location within Europe
- Coordinates: 41°05′N 1°27′W
- Country: Spain
- Autonomous community: Aragon
- Province: Zaragoza
- Municipality: Balconchán

Area
  - Total: 19 km^{2} (7.3 sq mi)

Population (2025-01-01)
  - Total: 19
  - Density: 1.0/km^{2} (2.6/sq mi)
- Time zone: UTC+1 (CET)
  - Summer (DST): UTC+2 (CEST)

Balconchán is a municipality located in the province of Zaragoza, Aragon, Spain. According to the 2004 census (INE), the municipality has a population of 18 inhabitants.

The town is located near the Sierra de Santa Cruz.

== See also ==
- List of municipalities in Zaragoza
