= Valdehorna =

Coordinates: 41°04′N 1°25′W

- municipality
- Flag Coat of arms
- Interactive map of Valdehorna
- Country: Spain
- Autonomous community: Aragon
- Province: Zaragoza

Area
  - Total: 8 km^{2} (3.1 sq mi)

Population (2025-01-01)
  - Total: 29
  - Density: 3.6/km^{2} (9.4/sq mi)
- Time zone: UTC+1 (CET)
  - Summer (DST): UTC+2 (CEST)

Valdehorna is a municipality located in the province of Zaragoza, Aragon, Spain. According to the 2004 census (INE), the municipality had a population of 51 inhabitants. The town is located near the Sierra de Santa Cruz.

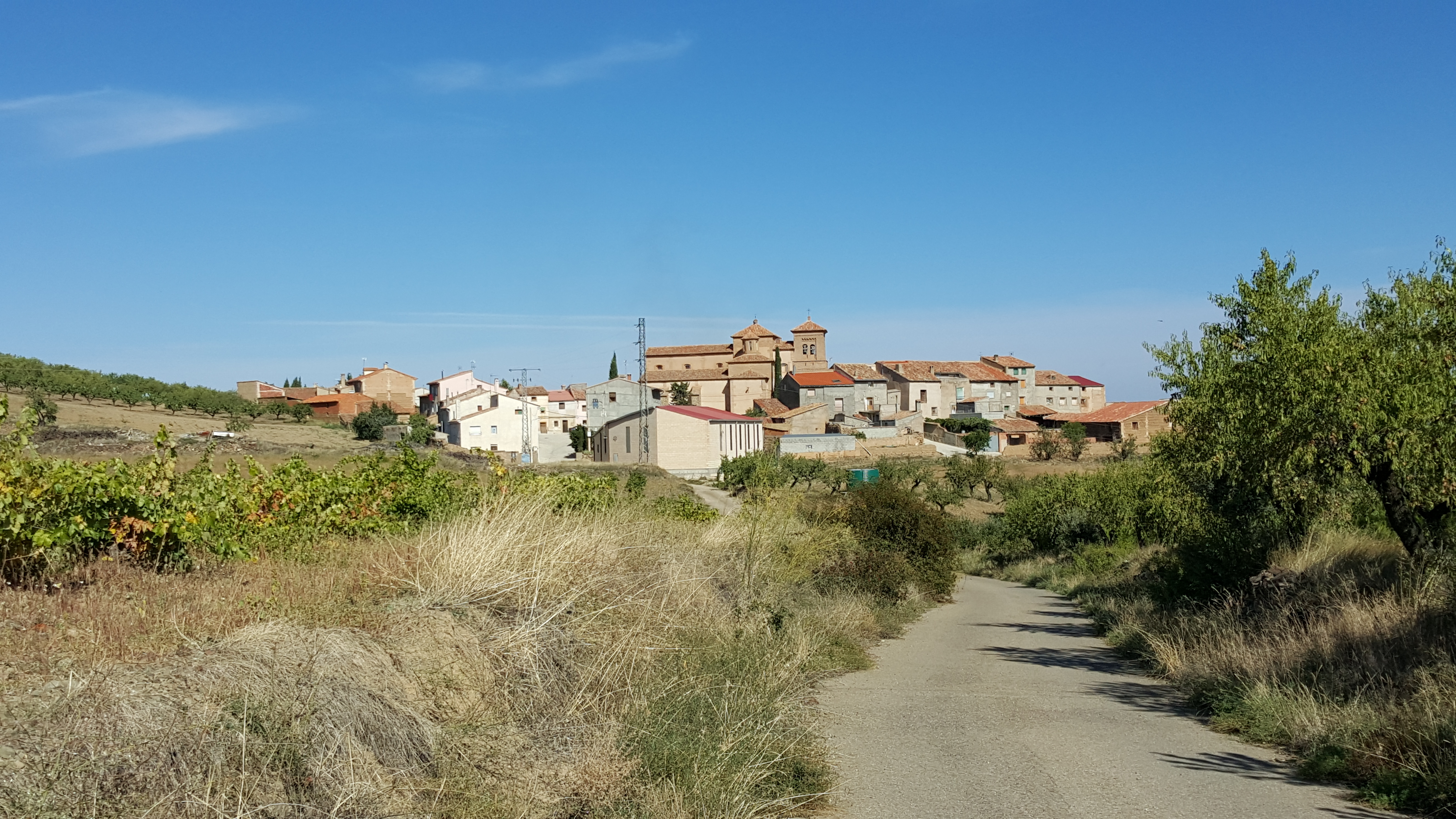
View Valdehorna, Zaragoza, Spain

== See also ==
- List of municipalities in Zaragoza
