= Villahermosa del Campo =

- municipality
- Flag Coat of arms

- Location within Spain
- Coordinates: 41°07′N 1°15′W
- Country: Spain
- Autonomous community: Aragon
- Province: Teruel
- Comarca: Jiloca

Area
  - Total: 19.20 km^{2} (7.41 sq mi)
- Elevation: 956 m (3,136 ft)

Population (2025-01-01)
  - Total: 91
  - Density: 4.7/km^{2} (12/sq mi)
- Time zone: UTC+1 (CET)
  - Summer (DST): UTC+2 (CEST)

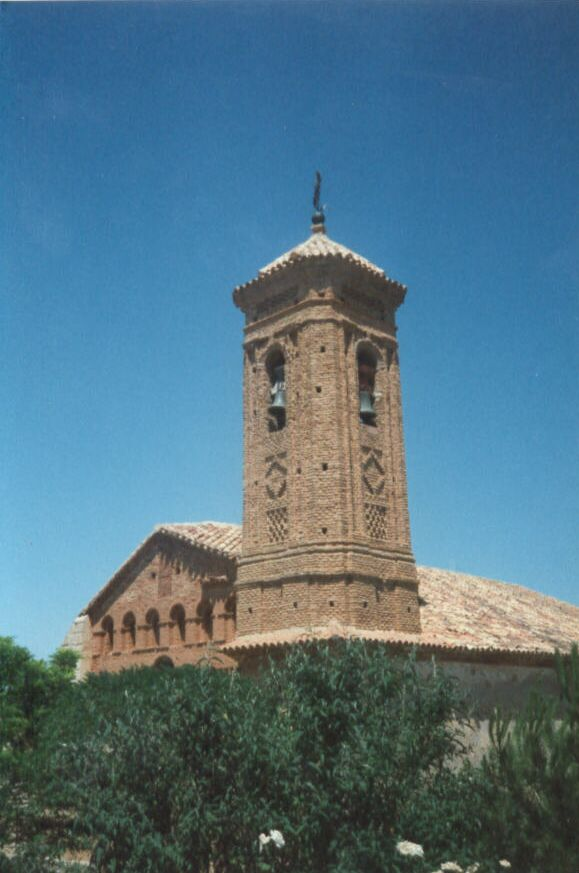
Belltower of the 15th century Santa María Magdalena church in Villahermosa

Villahermosa del Campo is a municipality located at the feet of the Sierra de Cucalón, in the province of Teruel, Aragon, Spain. According to the 2004 census (INE), the municipality has a population of 97 inhabitants.

There are ruins of ancient Iberian settlements located within Villahermosa's municipal term. These are known as Castillo de Nogueras and Castillo de Santa Catalina.

It is located at the western end of the Sierra de Cucalón area.

== See also ==
- Jiloca Comarca
- List of municipalities in Teruel
