= Argente =

- Municipality
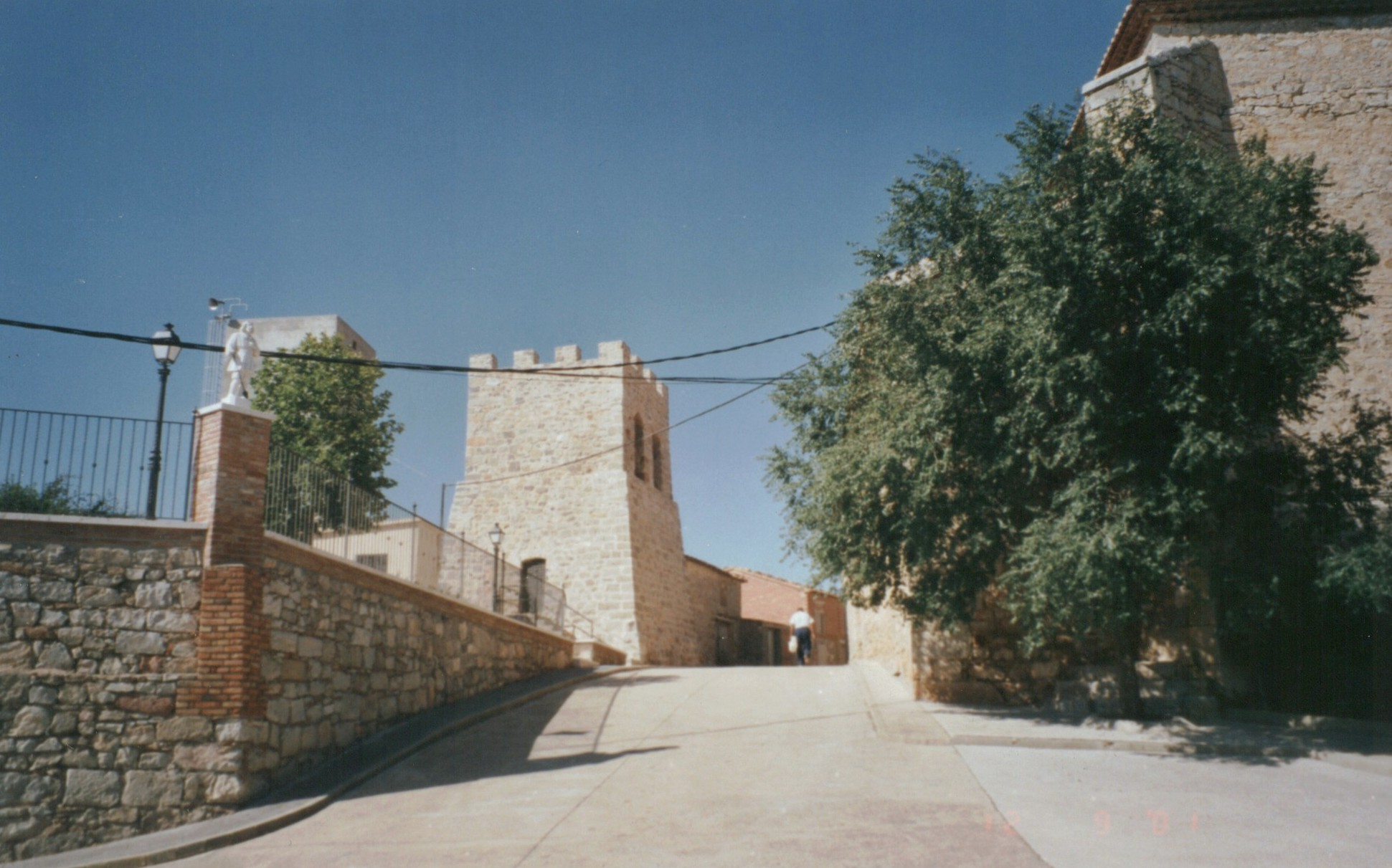

- Flag Coat of arms

- Location within Spain
- Coordinates: 40°41′N 1°10′W
- Country: Spain
- Autonomous community: Aragon
- Province: Teruel

Area
  - Total: 69 km^{2} (27 sq mi)

Population (2025-01-01)
  - Total: 204
  - Density: 3.0/km^{2} (7.7/sq mi)
- Time zone: UTC+1 (CET)
  - Summer (DST): UTC+2 (CEST)

Argente is a municipality located in the province of Teruel, Aragon, Spain. According to the 2018 census (INE), the municipality has a population of 198 inhabitants.

== See also ==
- List of municipalities in Teruel
