= Gamarra Mayor =

Hamlet in Álava

Gamarra Mayor/Gamarra Nagusia
- Concejo
- Coat of arms

- Location within Álava Location within the Basque Country Location within Spain
- Coordinates: 42°52′41″N 2°39′28″W
- Country: Spain
- Autonomous community: Basque Country
- Province: Álava
- Comarca: Vitoria-Gasteiz
- Municipality: Vitoria-Gasteiz
- Elevation: 510 m (1,670 ft)

Population (2022)
  - Total: 241
- Postal code: 01013

Gamarra Mayor (Spanish pronunciation: [ɡaˈmara maˈʝoɾ]) or Gamarra Nagusia (Basque pronunciation: [gamara naɣus̺i.a], alternatively in Basque: Gamarra) is a village and concejo in the municipality of Vitoria-Gasteiz, in Álava province, Basque Country, Spain. Located next to the urban area of Vitoria-Gasteiz, it is the starting point of the N-240 road to Bilbao. As such, it is one of the main entry points to the city.
