= Manuel Santa Cruz Loidi =

Spanish Roman Catholic priest and guerilla leader

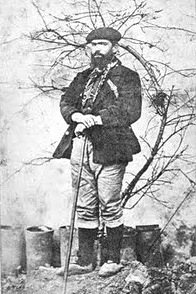
- Born: Manuel Santa Cruz Loidi; 1842; Elduain, Spain
- Died: 1926 (aged 83–84); Pasto, Colombia
- Known for: guerilla leader
- Political party: Carlism

Manuel Ignacio Santa Cruz Loidi (1842–1926) was a Spanish Roman Catholic priest. For some 35 years he served on apostolic mission in Colombia, where he was heading a parish in rural interior of the Pasto province; for some 15 years he held also various minor posts in Jamaica. He is best known, however, for his activity in 1872-1873, when he commanded a Carlist guerilla unit during the civil war in Spain. As "cura Santa Cruz" (priest Santa Cruz) or simply as "El Cura" (The Priest) he gained notoriety for cruelty and in the Spanish public discourse of the late 19th century he became a symbol of savage brutality. In this role – though also with a grade of ambiguity - he featured as a protagonist in a few great works of Spanish Modernist literature of the early 20th century and became a mythical figure long before his own death.

== Family and youth ==
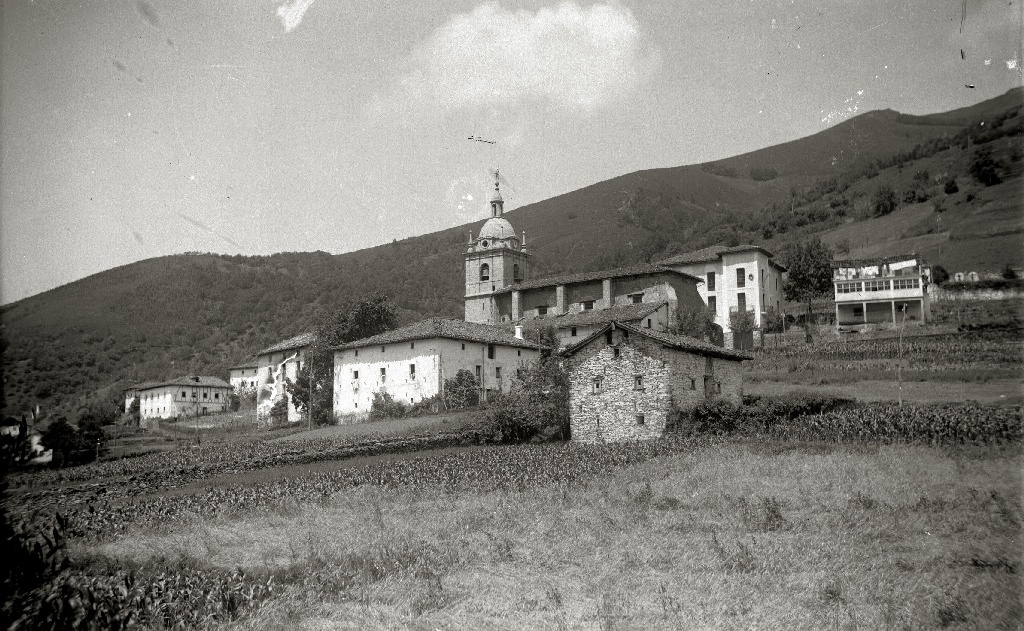
Elduain

Manuel Santa Cruz Loidi was descendant to Basque rural working-class families; generations of his ancestors were farmers living in the Oria river valley, in the Gipuzkoan county of Tolosa. His paternal grandfather Pascual de Santa Cruz was a native of Andoain yet he settled in Elduain, probably on the economy of his wife María Bautista Sarove. Their son and the father of Manuel Ignacio, Francisco Antonio Santa Cruz Sarove (1784-1842), in 1824 married Juana Josefa Loidi Urrestarazu (1803–1871); she was the daughter of Miguel Ignacio Loidi, a native of Amezketa, and María Ignacia Urrestarazu, who originated from Orendain. The couple lived in Elduain; their caserio, known as Zamonea, was among the poorer ones in the village. It is not clear how many children they had, though according to some sources Manuel Ignacio was not their only child and he had at least one sister. Following the death of her husband María Ignacia remarried with a widower Juan Ignacio Betelu Muñagorri (1795–1861); it is not clear whether they had any offspring.

Manuel was raised by his mother and step-father and initially did not differ from other village boys. It is not clear where he was first educated; at some stage he was taken care of by his much older paternal cousin, a local priest Francisco Antonio Sasiain Santa Cruz (1812–1898); he taught the teenager Latin and apparently directed him towards the religious career. Indeed, in 1861 Manuel entered the seminary in Vitoria; during the first 3 years he was obtaining high grades and was rewarded with the meritissimus title; later his performance worsened, reportedly due to health problems. He was ordained as a priest in 1866 and posted to Hernialde, a village a few miles from his native one. According to some sources he was first nominated a coadjutor; other authors claim he initially acted as a vicar. Following the death of the parish priest it was Santa Cruz who became his successor at an unspecified time in the late 1860s; he allegedly assumed his duties with frenetic energy and as a spiritual shepherd he tended to rigidity, himself adhering to an austere living pattern.

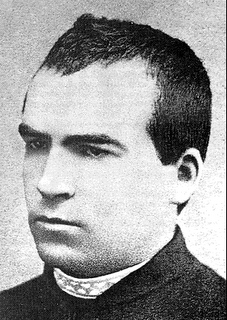
Santa Cruz, 1870

Since his father had served as a Carlist volunteer during the last civil war and since legitimist sympathies prevailed among the rural Gipuzkoan folk, it is likely that Manuel from his youth was growing in an ambience strongly flavored with Carlism. His position was probably strengthened during the seminary years, as Carlism was popular also among the lower and regular clergy of the province. In line with the Traditionalist outlook Santa Cruz assumed a decisively hostile stand towards the 1868 revolution, from behind the pulpit lambasting the new regime as an ungodly, depraved system. His inflammatory sermons gained him attention of the authorities; in October 1870 a Guardia Civil patrol showed up in Hernialde to detain him after a Sunday Mass. Santa Cruz took advantage of a somewhat loose approach of his captors and fled, in a few days crossing to France.

== Guerilla leader ==
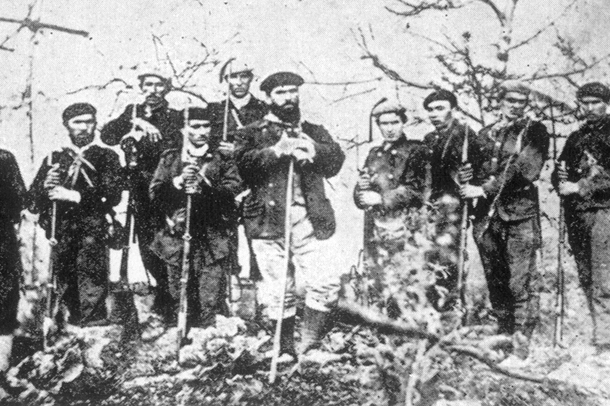
Santa Cruz and his men, 1873

Following some 18 months of exile in Bayonne, in 1872–73 Santa Cruz was taking part in the guerilla warfare prior and during the Third Carlist War. His record falls into 4 separate strings: from April till May 1872, from June till August 1872, from December 1872 till July 1873, and in December 1873, all separated by periods of taking refuge in France. Initially, he joined a unit led by a Carlist veteran Pedro Recondo; serving as a chaplain, Santa Cruz was gaining experience in rural irregular tactics. Since the summer of 1872 he was leading his own troops; initially the group consisted of some 15–25 men, but later it grew and in literature is estimated at 200, 500, or even 1,000, with an informal, in-between command structure built up. The detachment was rather loosely incorporated into the Carlist war effort; at early stages it was assigned a vague task of "guarding the Northern borderline" by the legitimist general staff, yet it seems that the unit retained great autonomy and operated independently.

In military terms the activity of Santa Cruz’ unit consisted of harassing the enemy logistics network and raiding minor garrisons. The former included disrupting postal service, arms transports, or railway connections; the latter included descending upon smaller locations and destroying archives, pillaging Guardia Civil or Carabineros posts, abducting local officials, and staging shows of prowess. The Liberal high command was forced to diminish their frontline strength and to assign more troops to vigilance and patrol duties. However, in line with his guerilla strategy Santa Cruz avoided open confrontation against enemy forces; cases of accepting a battle usually resulted in defeat, e.g. in Aia. When facing enemy roundup Santa Cruz used to disband his group and to set re-assembly terms; taking advantage of perfect familiarity with the mountainous Gipuzkoan countryside and support of the local population, he kept evading the governmental chase. Santa Cruz operated across all the province of Gipuzkoa, though he was noted also in neighboring areas of Biscay, Álava, and particularly Navarre.

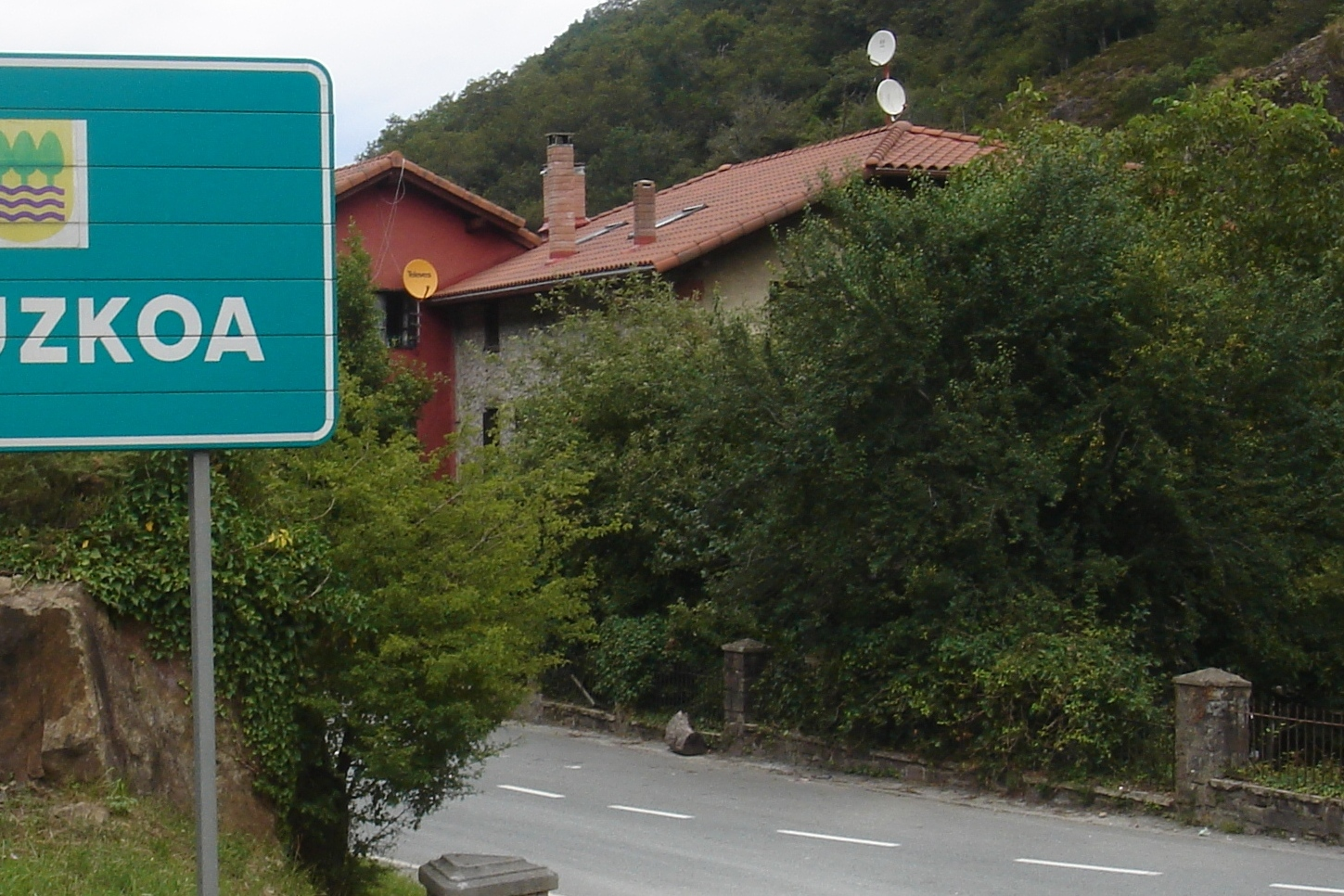
Endarlaza, 2016

Since early 1873 Santa Cruz gained notoriety for cruelty and was charged with committing acts of barbarity. They consisted of executions of prisoners, including women or members of his own unit when suspected of treason, burning down settlements, or administering corporal punishment. The episode which caused particular outrage occurred in June 1873, when santacrucistas assaulted a fortified provincial border control post in Endarlaza. Claiming that during the shootout the defenders had mischievously displayed a white flag to fire at the approaching Carlists later on, Santa Cruz had his men execute 35 carabineros who had ultimately surrendered. The Carlist high command was continuously uneasy about Santa Cruz; the Endarlaza episode proved to be the last straw. The local legitimist commander general Antonio Lizarraga, who was trying to bring Santa Cruz in line for some time, demanded that the insubordinate priest back down. Eventually, Santa Cruz found himself hunted down by the Liberals and the Carlists alike; he disbanded his unit and withdrew into France.

== France, Britain and Jamaica ==
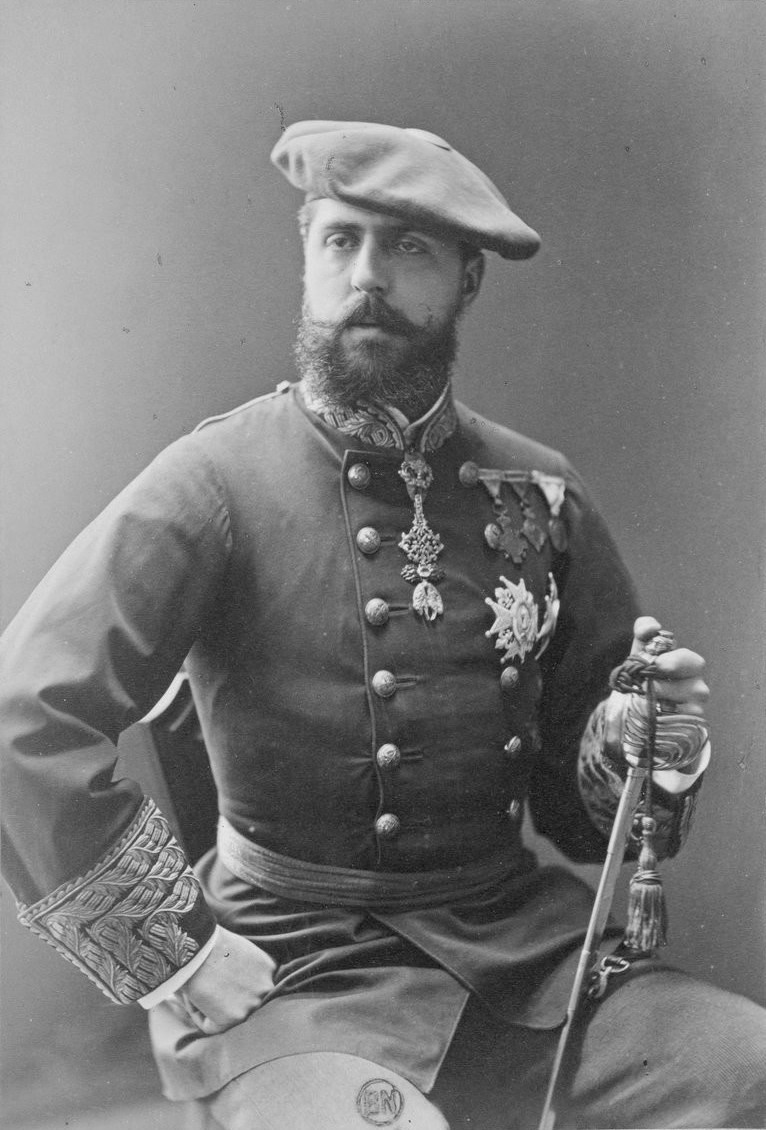
Carlos VII

In France Santa Cruz seemed disoriented and with no direction; he spent more than a year mostly in small villages in the French Basque country. Some of his former men suggested resumption of warfare, though Lizarraga confirmed that in such case he would be persecuted. The Madrid government filed a request for extradition, turned down by the French. Gendarmerie kept a close watch on him and at one point Santa Cruz was detained in Bayonne; he was pressed to leave the country. In late 1874 or early 1875 he found himself in the Jesuit college in Lille; thanks to support of the Cambrai archbishop René-François Régnier, Santa Cruz's plea for clemency was accepted in the Vatican and he was reinstated to regular religious duty, abandoned during the wartime years. He intended to commence missionary service; as part of his preparation the Jesuits directed him to their establishment in Britain, where Santa Cruz was to learn English. In early 1876 he met his king Carlos VII in London but accounts differ; according to some Santa Cruz defended his wartime record, according to others he regretted his conduct and begged for mercy. Shortly afterwards he sailed to Jamaica. The Catholic administration of the island since the 1840s had been dominated by the English Jesuit province and since the 1860s their activity was on the rise; Santa Cruz was dispatched in a group of 3 priests.

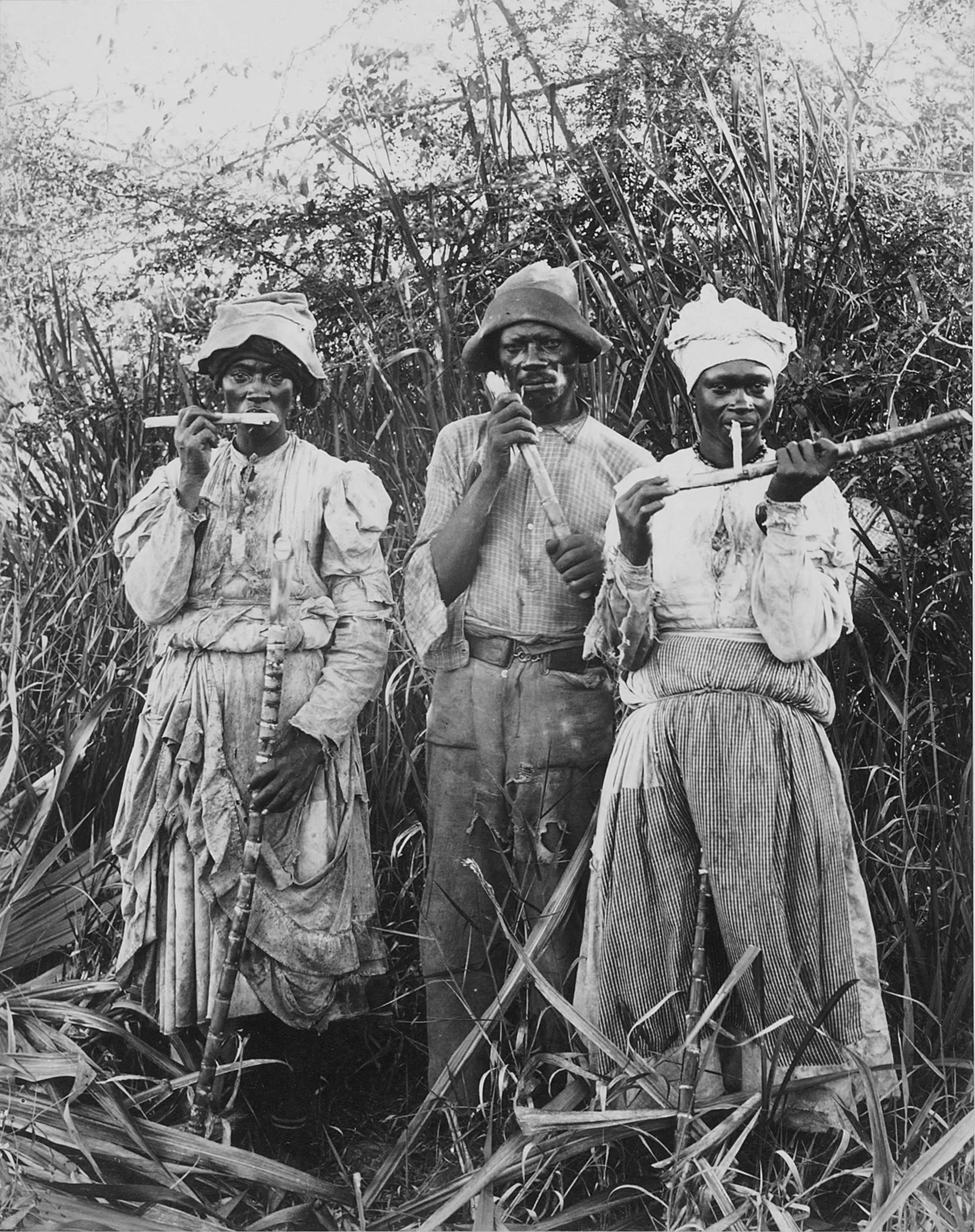
Cane cutters, Jamaica

Upon crossing the Atlantic Santa Cruz abandoned the first surname and started using only his maternal one; hence, in America he became known as Manuel Loidi. In December 1876 he was first recorded as performing religious service in Jamaica; he was later to serve in the parishes of St. Andrews, Portland and St. Mary, all located in the Eastern part of the island. His exact position in the religious structure is not clear; in documentation available he is listed as "clergyman"; until the early 1880s he is recorded usually as administering baptisms, marriages and especially funerals, mostly though not exclusively in the location of King's Weston. At one point or another he served in 5 different mission stations and himself founded another nine. Today he is particularly noted for his work in the small Preston Hill village, one of the first Catholic congregations outside Kingston and inhabited mostly by descendants of the Castle Mine slaves. Santa Cruz is credited with construction of a wooden St. Francis Xavier church, which served the faithful for decades. It seems that Santa Cruz and the Jamaica Jesuits lived in extreme poverty, as the destitute and barren local Catholic community was hardly in a position to support them. It is not clear why Santa Cruz abandoned Jamaica in 1891 or 1892; it is likely that his leaving the island was related to change in missionary administration, as in the early 1890s the Jamaica mission was allotted to the Maryland-New York Jesuit province and soon the US Jesuits took over.

== Colombia ==
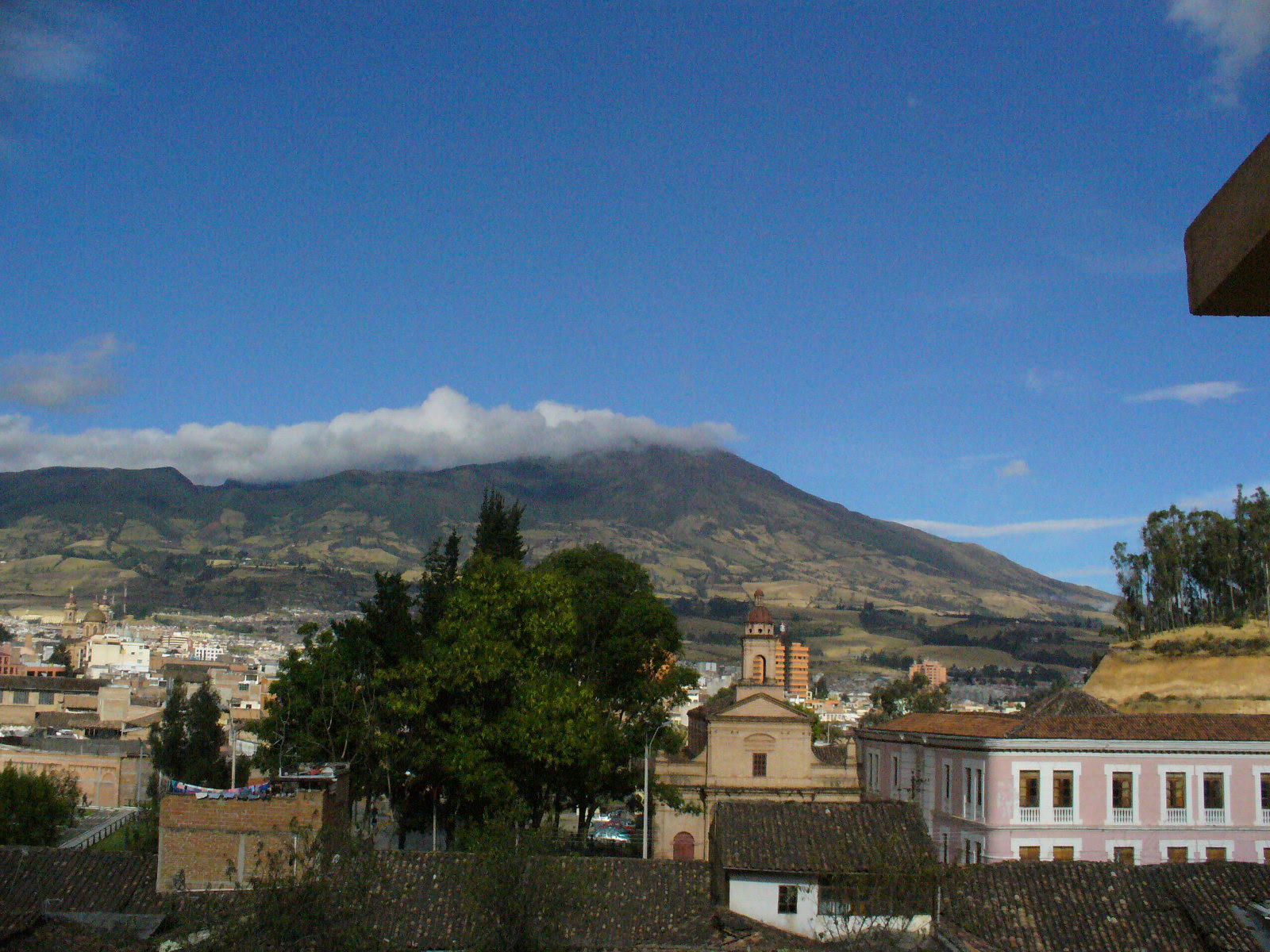
Pasto, present view

It is not clear in what circumstances Santa Cruz moved to Colombia; one version is that the option was suggested and facilitated by an anonymous, influential Spanish Jesuit and a friend of his. Santa Cruz agreed to join Colegio Javieriano, which served as a Jesuit college and a seminary in Pasto, capital of Nariño department. He arrived in the city in 1892, possibly having spent some time in Panama earlier. In the college he was teaching English, French, Latin, geography and math; his worn-out cassock and a long beard made him look like a beggar. He was not a member of the Jesuit order; his request for admission was turned down, reportedly because his wartime deeds required a long penitence period. Santa Cruz was allowed to enter the monastery and to follow the rules, but his formal admission was adjourned until an unspecified later date.

Santa Cruz taught in Pasto at least until 1898. The following year Colombia was torn by a Thousand Days’ War, with Pasto turned into a Conservative stronghold dominated by the personalities of Ezequiel Moreno Díaz and Pedro Schumacher, two hardline bishops. According to a Colombian historian both hierarchs approached Santa Cruz, who was known for uncompromising anti-liberal sermons. Santa Cruz was reportedly asked to lead operations against the Liberal insurgents, yet he declined. However, he apparently agreed to assist in some kind of staff work, offering his advice in terms of planning and strategy; in this role he proved very successful.

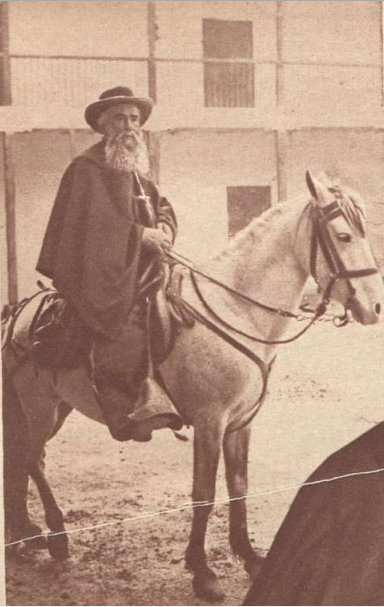
Santa Cruz in Colombia

Following the ultimate Conservative victory in 1902 Santa Cruz founded the village of San Ignacio, located in the Andes some 20 km north of Pasto in the county of Buesaco; for the second time since the Hernialde spell he assumed the role of a parson. The hamlet was inhabited by an extremely poor indigenous population; it seems that apart from providing spiritual service, Santa Cruz tried to support it economically. Teaching the locals agriculture, he travelled across the county begging, with the money collected dedicated to needs of the San Ignacio natives. Santa Cruz spent some 18 uneventful years in San Ignacio and according to some sources was greatly respected among the locals for his apostolic work but also for his personal humility and exemplary life; his most lasting achievement was construction of the local San Ignacio church.

Santa Cruz retained his reactionary ultra-conservative outlook; during local electoral campaigns he used to instruct his flock how to dodge the corrupted election system and vote the candidates he considered right. It seems that he also remained a Carlist; he corresponded with his old-time war comrades back in Spain and in a separate letter pledged loyalty to Don Jaime, though there are suggestions he also recognized Don Alfonso. In 1920 he was eventually admitted to the Jesuit novitiate and in 1922 he formally entered the order. It is not clear where Santa Cruz spent his senility; in the Pasto monastery or in San Ignacio, where he was eventually buried in the church he constructed.

== Black legend ==
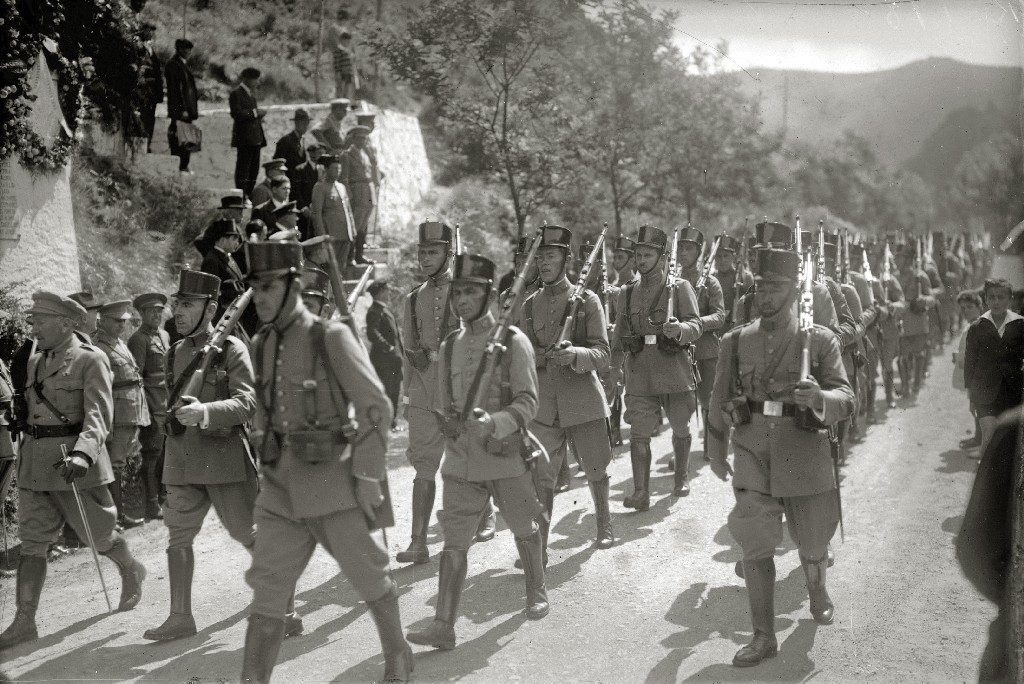
1920s, Endarlaza; official homage to carabineros executed by Santa Cruz

Since January 1873 the press reported misdeeds of Santa Cruz, dubbed assassin, criminal or barbarian. In 1874-1876 newspapers speculated about his re-entry into war. In the late 1870s media lost track of him until he was located in Jamaica in the mid-1880s, and his name reverberated as a memory of past atrocities. In 1880 he became one of the key protagonists of Vida, hechos y hazañas del famoso bandido y cabecilla Rosa Samaniego, a short novel written by an unidentified author. The book portrayed Santa Cruz as a bloody ringleader; with many fictitious episodes it became very popular and was re-published until the early 1890s. In the press Santa Cruz was not infrequently mentioned also as a sample of treacherous clergy. From time to time he was reported back in Europe; as speculations about another Carlist insurgency were on the rise in the late 1890s Santa Cruz was even reported seen in Spain. The wildest rumor had it that his son was to command a new Carlist unit. A monument was erected in Endarlaza to honor the executed carabineros.

In 1897 Santa Cruz appeared in Paz en la guerra by Miguel de Unamuno and for some 20 years he kept featuring in greatest works of Spanish literary Modernism. In 1906 he was treated somewhat more extensively in Sonata de invierno by Ramón Valle-Inclán, in 1908 in Zalacaín el aventurero by Pio Baroja, and in 1909 in two subsequent novels of Valle-Inclán, El resplandor de la hoguera and Gerifaltes de antaño; in the latter he was one of the two key protagonists. Finally, in 1918 Baroja dedicated to him a set of essays El cura Santa Cruz y su partida.

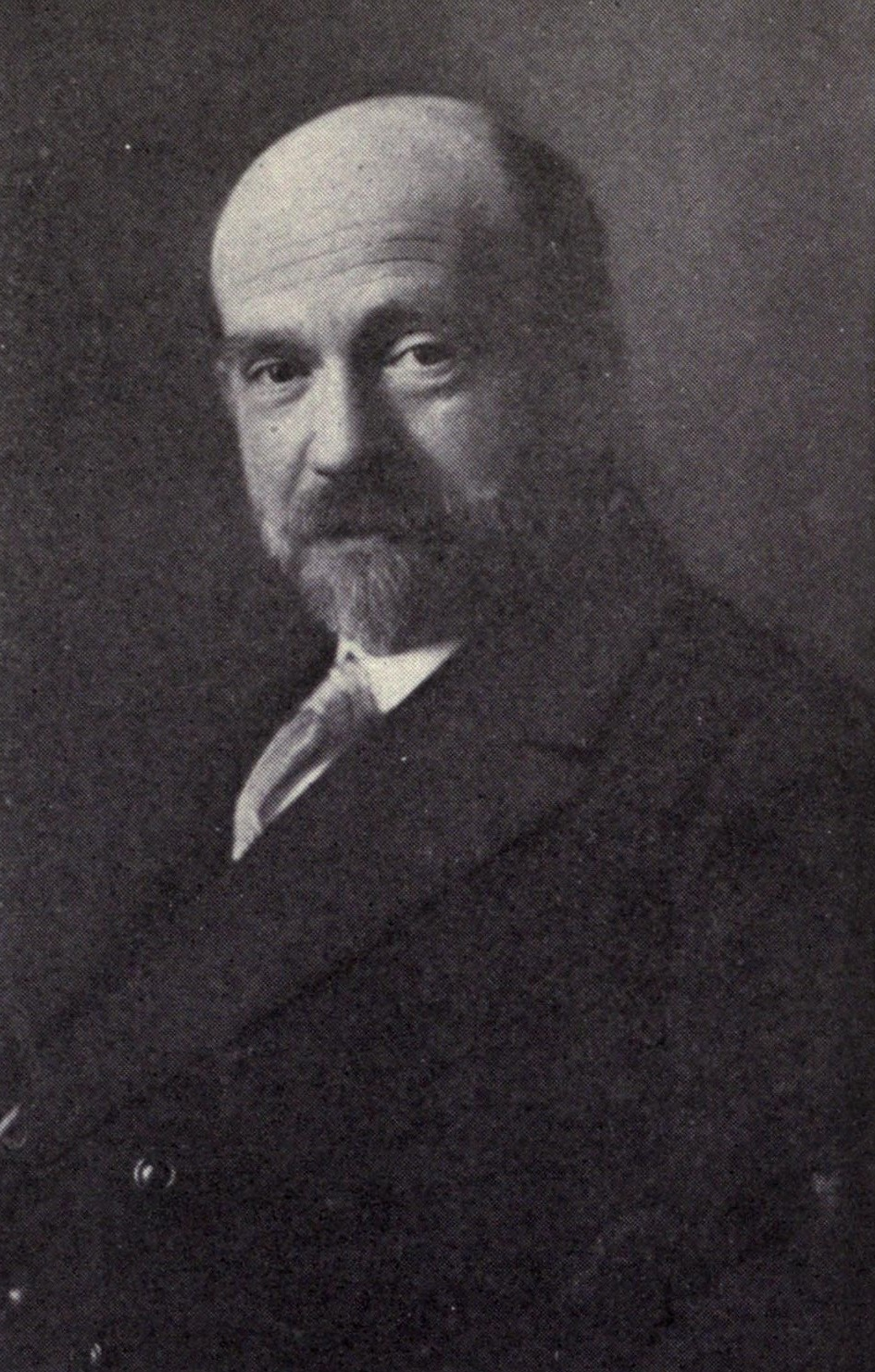
Pio Baroja

The role assigned to Santa Cruz by all 3 giants of Spanish literature differed. Baroja from his Nietzschean perspective portrayed Santa Cruz as a little man who disguised his inferiority with cruelty and epitomized "double barbarity of being a Catholic and a Carlist". In the case of Unamuno it is believed that Santa Cruz stood for an inflexible model of orthodoxy, be it religious, political or otherwise, a model which was valid only within a set of parameters; Unamuno rejected it and presented the Spanish self as a result of dialectic interaction. Even more complex is the vision of Valle-Inclán. Some claim that Valle-Inclán presented dominant and at times even monstrous personalities of the past to confront them with meager men populating contemporary Spain. Others maintain that Valle-Inclán intended to evoke the atmosphere of ominous drama with satanic personalities. Whatever their intentions were, the noventayochistas and especially Baroja transformed a somewhat crude newspaper version of Santa Cruz into a powerful literary image enriched with diabolic and demonic features. This image persisted well into the 1930s, at times enhanced with new threads, e.g. this of "cura fascista". In the Francoist Spain the anti-Liberal stand of El Cura rendered cultivation of the black legend hardly feasible. After transición it was already a forgotten past which hardly elicited emotions; if so, they were much more ambiguous.

== White legend ==
Carlist standard

Carlism initially ignored Santa Cruz. Re-calibrating the movement as a "party of order", until late Restoration, Traditionalist politicians viewed him as an inconvenient ghost from their past. Things changed upon his death. The late 1920s saw three apologetic works, two flavored with Carlism; Bernoville focused on Catholic regionalism while Olazábal on Integrism; the third one by Orixe advanced Basque threads. Confrontational political milieu of the Republic helped the Carlists to re-claim Santa Cruz, e.g. in poetry, and upon outbreak of the civil war Traditionalist press linked military virtues of Requetés to these of El Cura. The Enderlaza monument was blown up by Carlist troops advancing from Navarre to Gipuzkoa in July 1936, but got silently reinstated in 1940. Two major Carlist historiographical works, written by Oyarzun in the 1940s and by Ferrer in the 1950s, approached El Cura with caution. In popular propaganda there were cases of exaltation yet Santa Cruz did not become an orthodox mythical hero. Youths from the progressist faction of Comunión Tradicionalista tried to re-claim El Cura, and in the early 1970s their terrorist organisation GAC declared that "the flag of Santa Cruz has been raised again". Today Santa Cruz marginally features on some private Carlist websites.

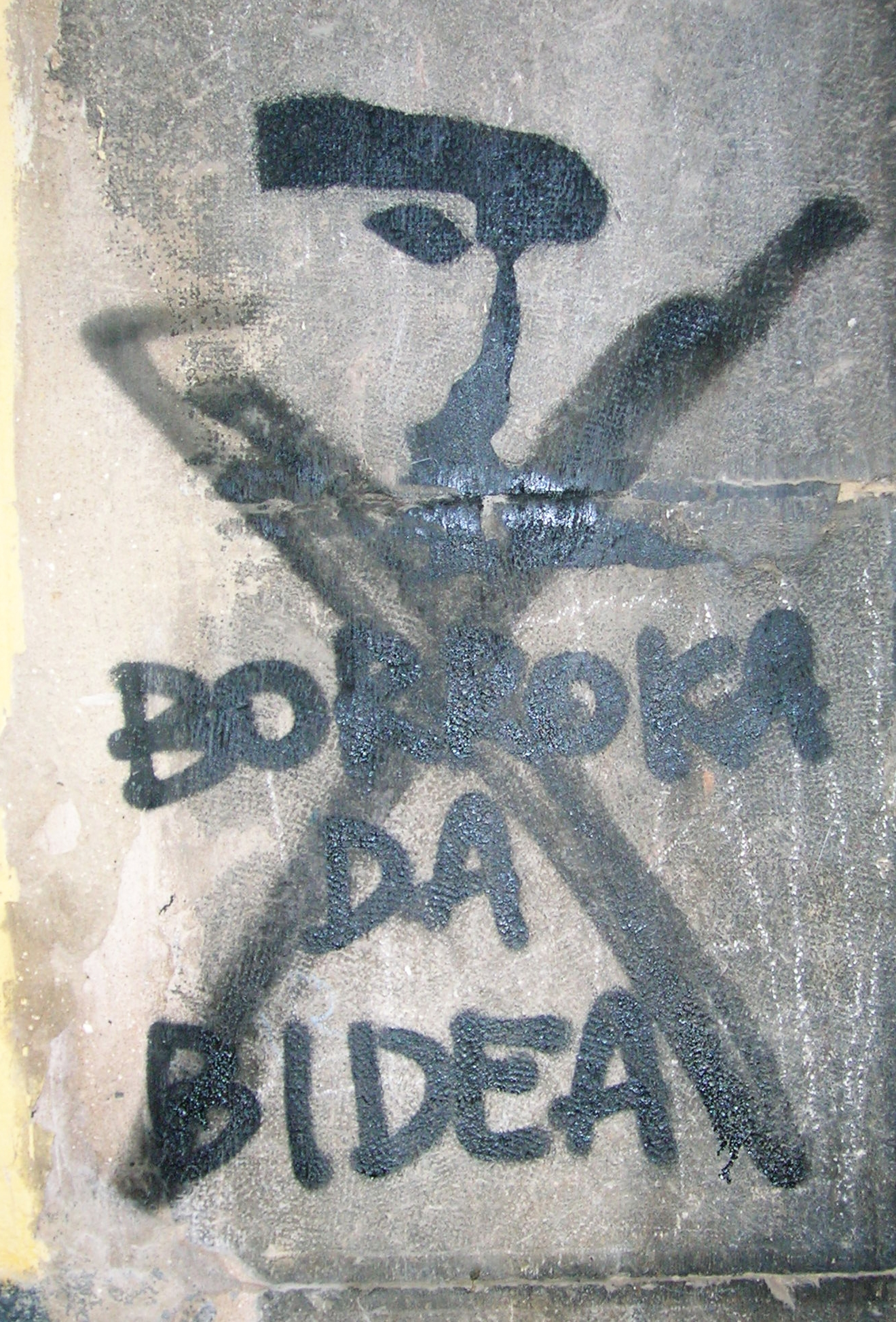
Fight is the way, or is it? nationalist murale in Vascongadas

In the vasco-navarrese area the Carlist social base was gradually taken over by Basque nationalism. Its radical faction attempted to re-format the image of Santa Cruz accordingly; violence and fanaticism were converted into virtues. El Cura started to feature in nationalist propaganda as a convenient hyperbole for violent action; in the 1980s the Herri Batasuna newspaper Egin ran a series of lengthy articles on El Cura and no nationalist figure dared to criticize him. As a result, papers noticed "admiration of left-wing youth for legendary Santa Cruz" and Baroja observed that "you can meet Cura Santa Cruz on any Basque street today." The vision of El Cura as spiritual embodiment of "these mountains", unforgiving but idealistic, was pursued in a 1990 Basque film of José Tuduri. Also a Basque historiographical study by Xabier Azurmendi set the protagonist deeply against the Basque background. Today Santa Cruz is still present in nationalist discourse and features on some websites, usually flavored with radical left-wing politics. In 2008 a Basque band Bizardunak released a song which cultivates the Santa Cruz myth; it remains in public circulation with references to ETA.

A new kind of narrative started to emerge in Colombia in the 21st century. Fundación Manuel Santa Cruz Loydi was set up to honor his work for the poor and to preserve his memory as exemplary missionary, who possibly bordered sanctity. The organisation strives to renovate the decayed San Ignacio church. Its leader, a historian Isidoro Medina Patiño, in 2005 released two versions of another biography, this time focused on his American period; he declares that the Santa-Cruz-related "conceptos canonizados de bueno o malo, pueden confundirse o alterarse", yet both versions remain highly apologetic and present a man who spent his life serving the others; for a similar role in Jamaica he is also acknowledged in Catholic encyclopedia.

== See also ==
- Traditionalism (Spain)
- Integrism (Spain)
- Carlism
- Carlism in literature
- Basque nationalism
