= Orcajo =

Coordinates: 41°07′N 1°29′W

- municipality
- Coat of arms
- Interactive map of Orcajo
- Country: Spain
- Autonomous community: Aragon
- Province: Zaragoza
- Municipality: Orcajo

Area
  - Total: 28 km^{2} (11 sq mi)

Population (2025-01-01)
  - Total: 65
  - Density: 2.3/km^{2} (6.0/sq mi)
- Time zone: UTC+1 (CET)
  - Summer (DST): UTC+2 (CEST)

Orcajo is a municipality located in the province of Zaragoza, Aragon, Spain. According to the 2021 census (INE), the municipality has a population of 58 inhabitants.

The town is located near the Sierra de Santa Cruz and the Laguna de Gallocanta.

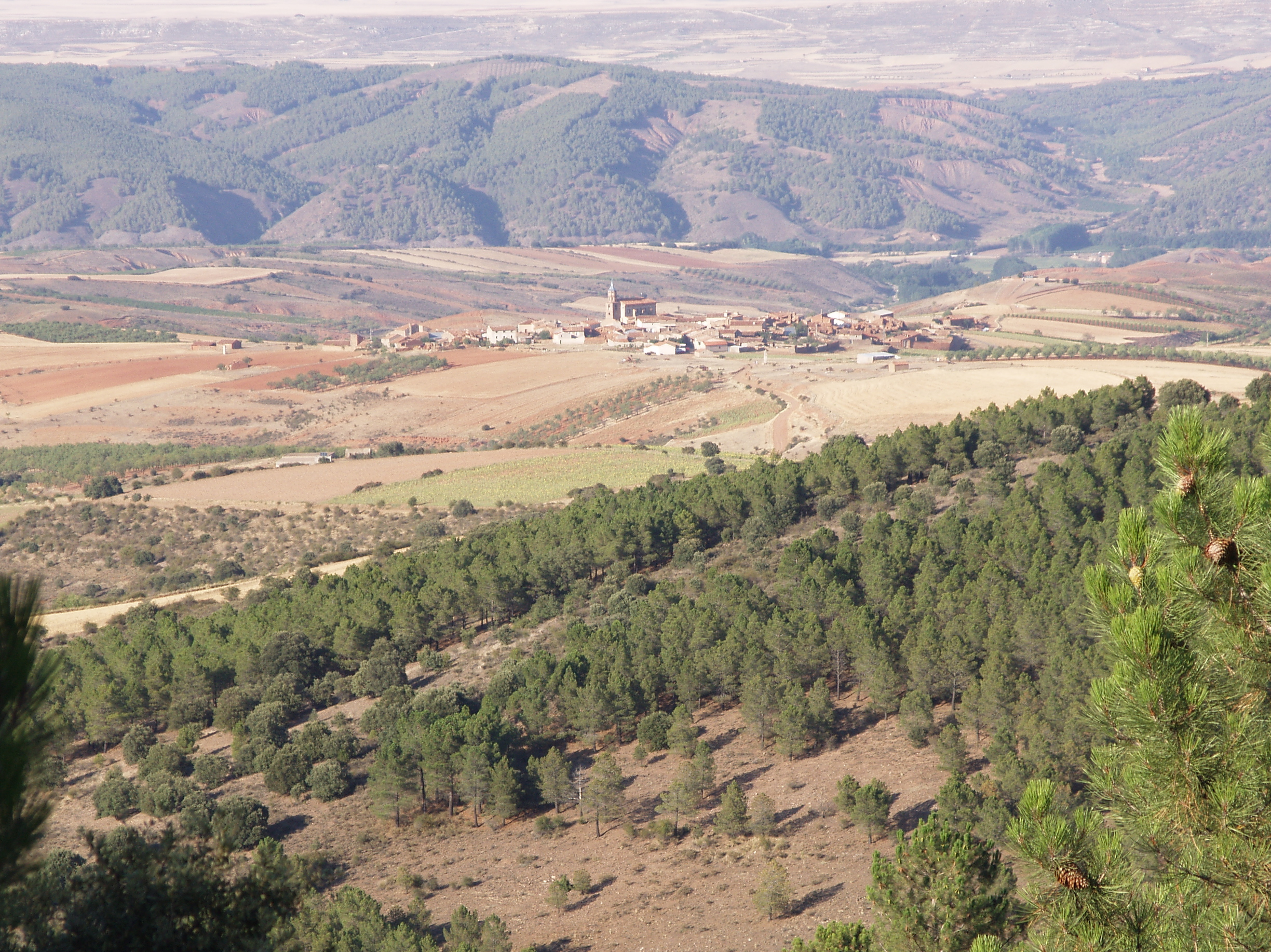
Orcajo and Surroundings

== See also ==
- List of municipalities in Zaragoza
