= Campo de Daroca =

- Comarca
- Location of Campo de Daroca in Aragon
- Coordinates: 41°07′N 1°25′W
- Country: Spain
- Autonomous community: Aragon
- Province: Zaragoza
- Capital: Daroca

Government
  - President: Pedro Miguel Hernández Gutiérrez (PP)
- Website: Comarca del Campo de Daroca

Campo de Daroca is one of the comarcas of Aragon, in the Province of Zaragoza, Aragon, Spain. It is located in the mountainous Iberian System area.

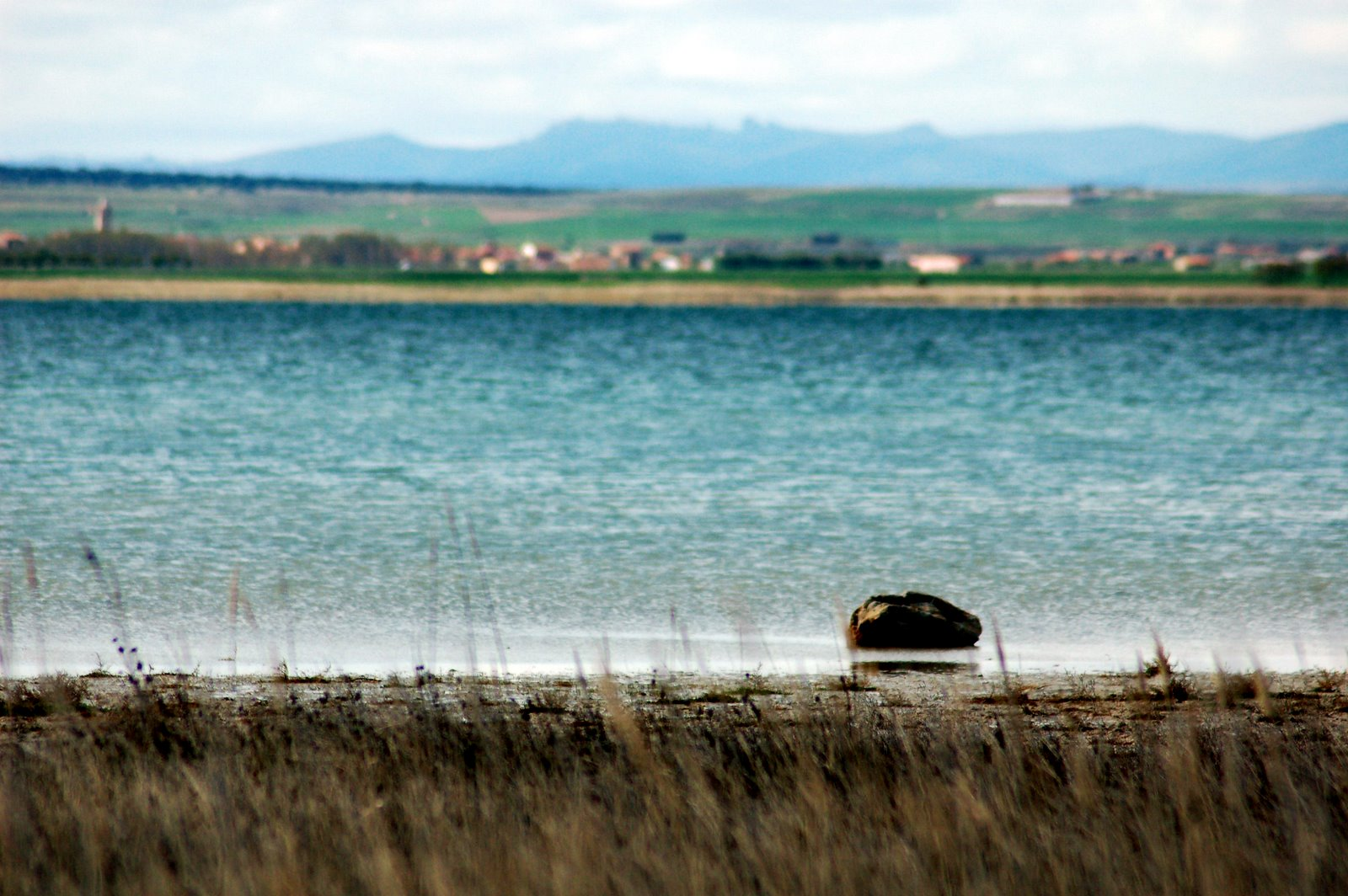
The Laguna de Gallocanta is located in Campo de Daroca

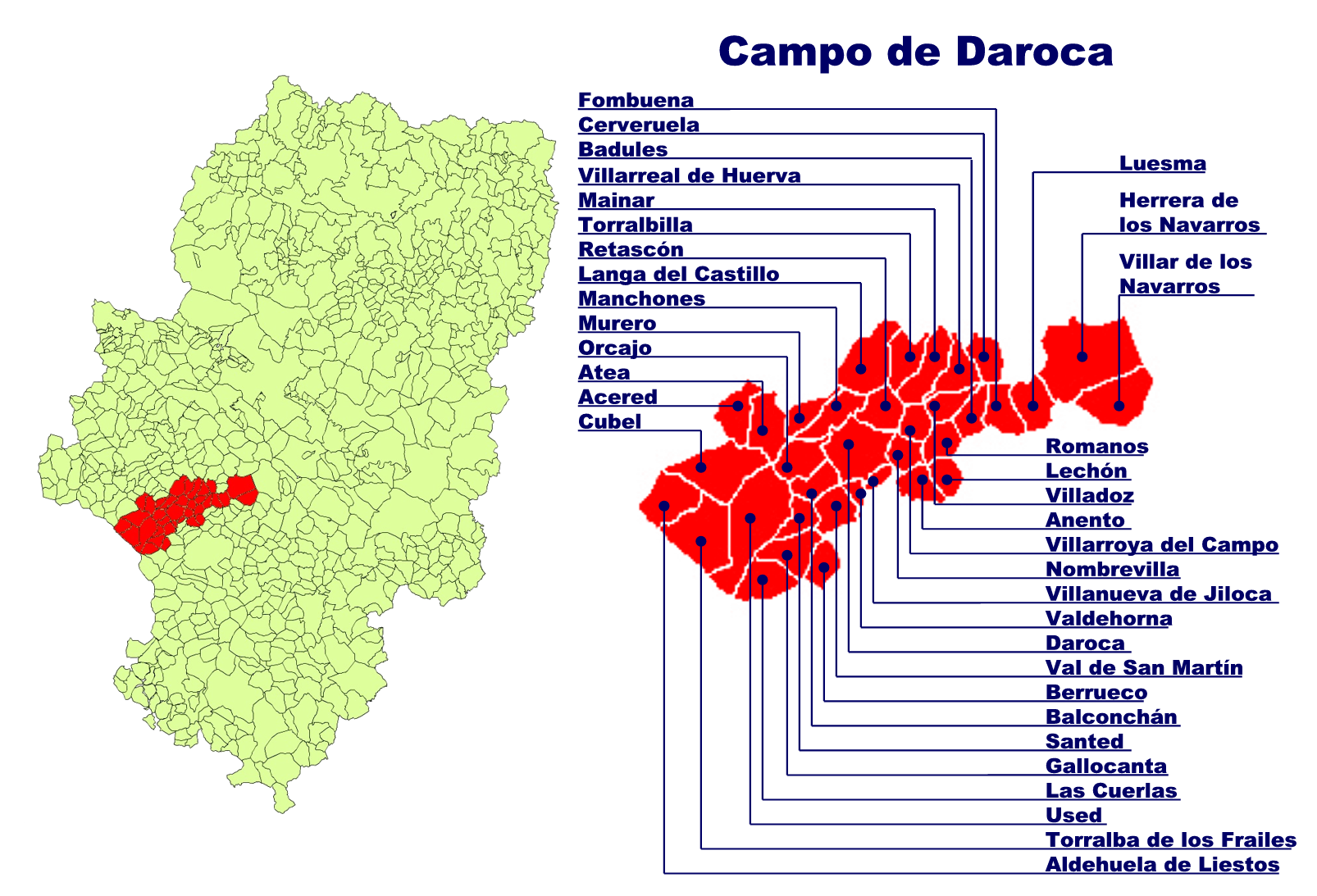
Location of the municipalities in Campo de Daroca

== Municipalities ==
The comarca includes the municipalities of Acered, Aldehuela de Liestos, Anento, Atea, Badules, Balconchán, Berrueco, Cerveruela, Cubel, Las Cuerlas, Daroca, Fombuena, Gallocanta, Herrera de los Navarros, Langa del Castillo, Lechón, Luesma, Mainar, Manchones, Murero, Nombrevilla, Orcajo, Retascón, Romanos, Santed, Torralba de los Frailes, Torralbilla, Used, Val de San Martín, Valdehorna, Villadoz, Villanueva de Jiloca, Villar de los Navarros, Villarreal de Huerva and Villarroya del Campo.

== Geography ==
It borders the Comunidad de Calatayud and Campo de Cariñena to the north, Señorío de Molina (in the province of Guadalajara) to the southwest, Jiloca to the south and Campo de Belchite to the east.
