= Villadoz =

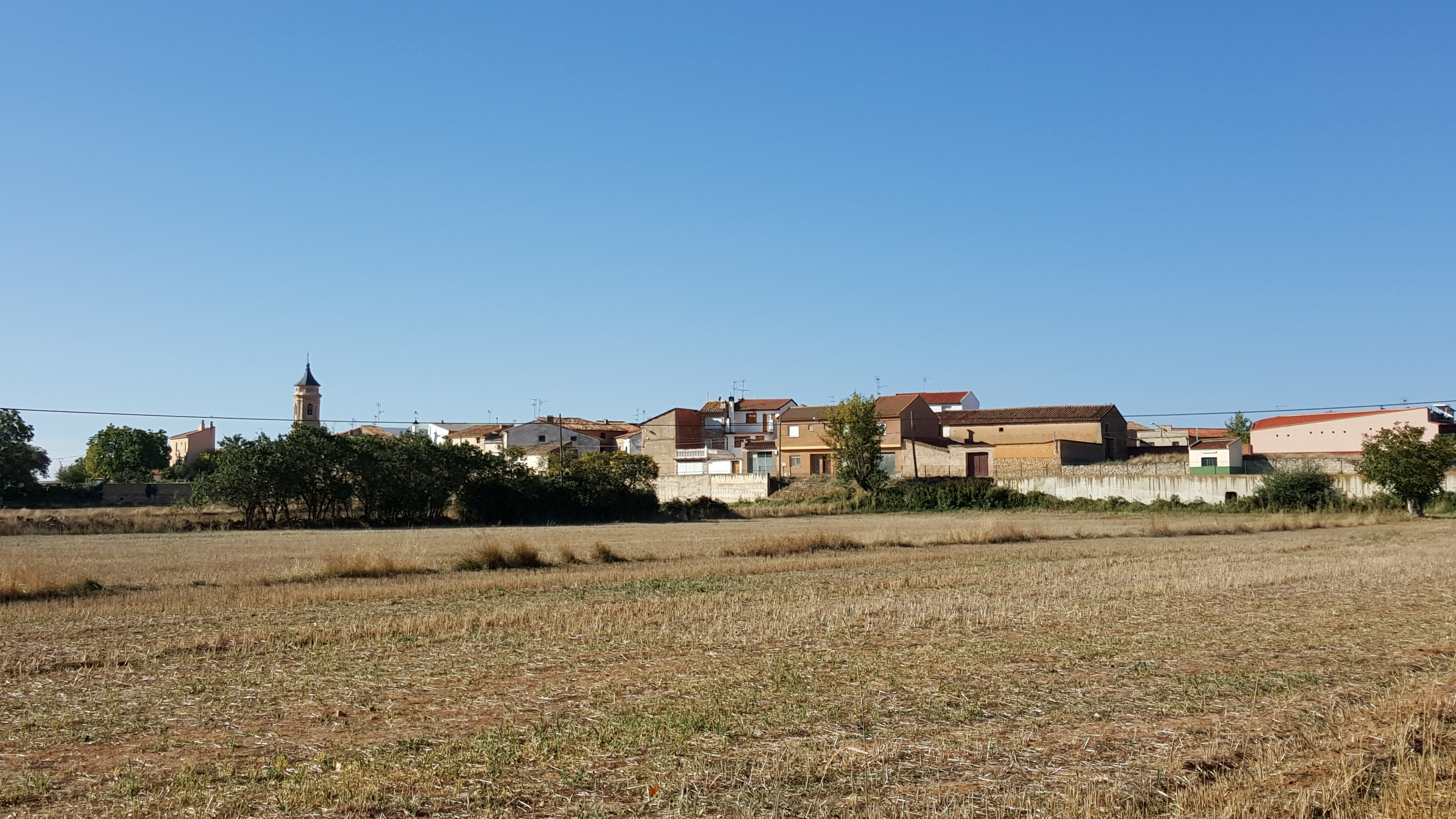
- View of Villadoz

- Flag Coat of arms

- Location within Spain
- Coordinates: 41°10′N 1°17′W
- Country: Spain
- Autonomous community: Aragon
- Province: Zaragoza
- Comarca: Campo de Daroca

Area
  - Total: 17 km^{2} (6.6 sq mi)
- Elevation: 900 m (3,000 ft)

Population (2025-01-01)
  - Total: 80
  - Density: 4.7/km^{2} (12/sq mi)
- Time zone: UTC+1 (CET)
  - Summer (DST): UTC+2 (CEST)
- Postal code: 50490
- Vehicle registration: Z

Villadoz is a municipality located in the province of Zaragoza, Aragon, Spain. According to the 2020 census, the municipality has a population of 95 inhabitants.

The town is located close to the Sierra del Peco mountain range.

== History ==
Roman archaeological remains back to the 2nd century B.C. have been found inside the municipal limit. Specifically, archaeologists found remains of lime near the river Huerva that seem to be the base of a Roman bridge, as well as Roman villas in the zone known as "Fuente del Manco" (Source of the Shortage), and part of the Roman causeway that was joining "Caecesaraugusta" (Zaragoza) with Saguntum (Sagunto) and Valentia (Valencia) near the Roman villas. They have also found numerous Roman ceramic objects in the zone of "Fuente del Manco".

In the year 1248, under the privilege of Jaime I of Aragon, the area became independent of Daroca, happening to form a part of "Sesma de Langa" in the Community of Daroca's Villages, which were depending directly on the king, lasting this administrative regime up to the death of Fernando VII of Spain in 1833, being disuelta already in 1838. The parochial church of Mudejar Aragonese art dedicated to Santiago Apostle was built in these first years, also in this time the hermitages dedicated to Saint Bartholome are built and dedicated to Mary Magdalene.

In the middle of the 19th century, the hermitages of Saint Bartholome and of Mary Magdalene were destroyed. A new hermitage was constructed dedicated to Saint Martin of Tours, the new patron saint of the village. In 1845, the Villarroya del Campo village was declared as a neighborhood of Villadoz. The neighborhood became free at the end of the same century.

In 1933, industry arrived in Villadoz through the railway network Zaragoza – Caminreal, which was administered by the company "Ways of Iron of the North". To half of the above-mentioned century there were unified the railway Spanish companies and it happened to form a part of Renfe; in addition, the line extended up to Teruel. In the late 1990s, the line was extended in both directions towards Valencia and Huesca respectively. During the Spanish Civil War, there is some information to indicate that there was an attempted attack on the railroad, and five republicans of Santa Cruz de Noguera were executed on the railway bridge. Four Falangists from the village were killed as well.

The village was modernized in the 21st century. In 2006, the múdejar tower of the parochial church of Santiago Apostle and the peiron of the Virgin of Carmen underwent reconstruction. In 2008, the A-23 (Mudejar Highway) was built, and a new railway alighting-place and a municipal park were also constructed.

== Festivities ==
- November 11: San Martín (Dedicated to the town’s patron saint, on Saturday night a bonfire is held in the main square, where a dinner of roast pork is prepared and then a popular music festival is held).
- Previous Sunday to Corpus Christi Feast (late May to early June): Trinidad (Pilgrimage to a near town's hermitage).
- July 25: Santiago Apóstol (Main festival of the town, held in the middle of the summer, with many different activities).

== Places of interest ==
Hermitage of San Martín (late romanesque art ruins), Hermitage of María Magdalena (chapel), Parish Church of Santiago Apóstol (Mudejar art tower and Gothic art altarpiece dated in the 15th century), and Peirón of the Virgen del Carmen (Mudejar art column, typical monument of this region).

There is also a peaceful natural area next to the Huerva River, formed by a riverside forest called in spanish "soto". It's considered a relaxing place and features a picnic area and car parking.

== Transports and communications ==
Villadoz has a railway's alighting-place, where the line 49th of Renfe Media Distancia (Huesca – Zaragoza – Teruel – Valencia) stops.

These are the roads that cross the municipal limit:

- A-23 (motorway) [French Border – Huesca – Zaragoza – Villadoz – Teruel – Sagunto (Province of Valencia)]
- CV-642 (Villadoz – A-23 – Villarreal de Huerva)
- CV-647 (A-23 – Villarroya del Campo)
- A-2509 (Mainar – Villadoz – Badules)

== See also ==
- Campo de Daroca
- List of municipalities in Zaragoza
