= Huerva =

River in Aragon, Spain

Coordinates: 41°18′58″N 1°4′15″W

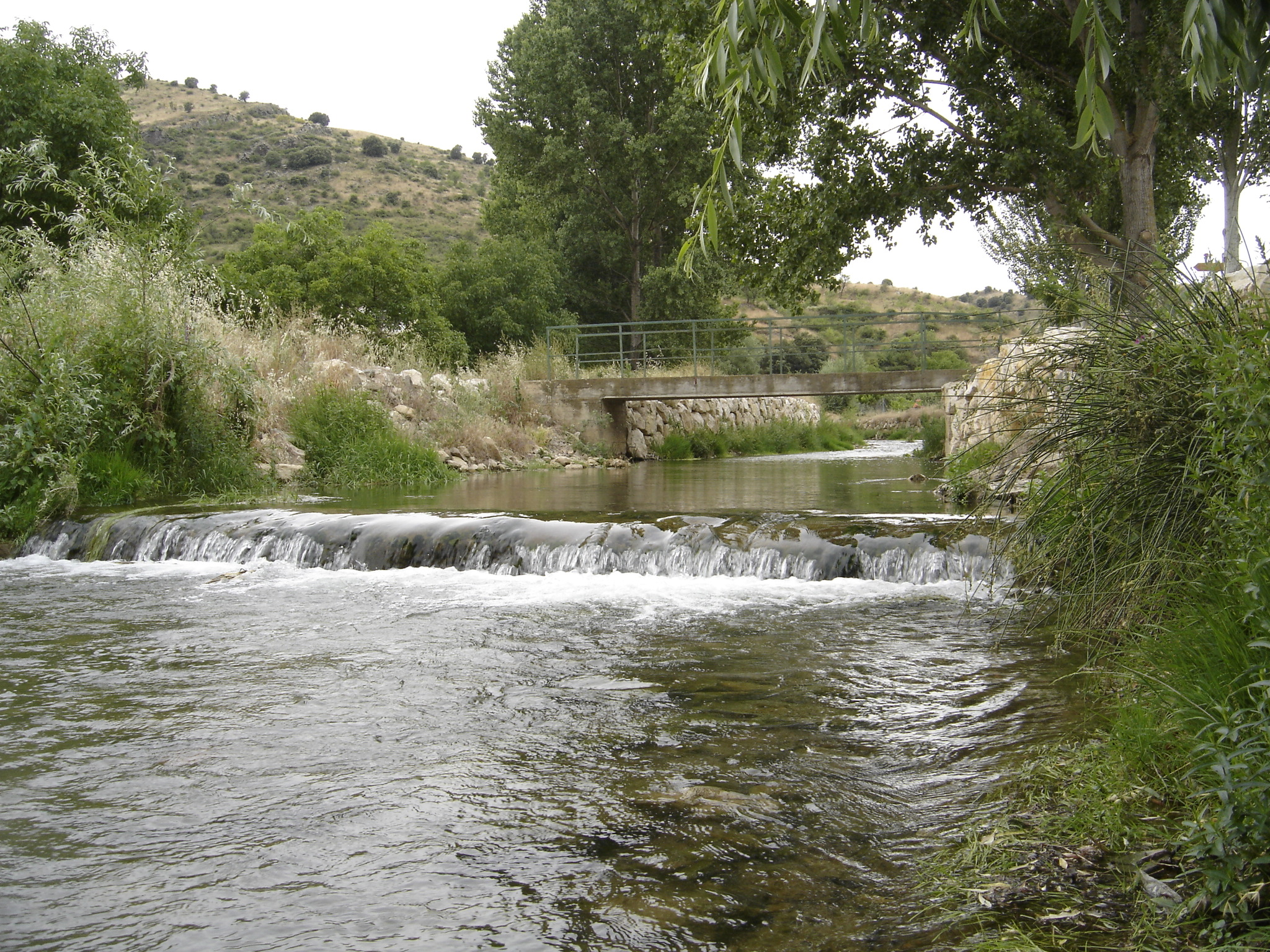
- The Huerva in Vistabella

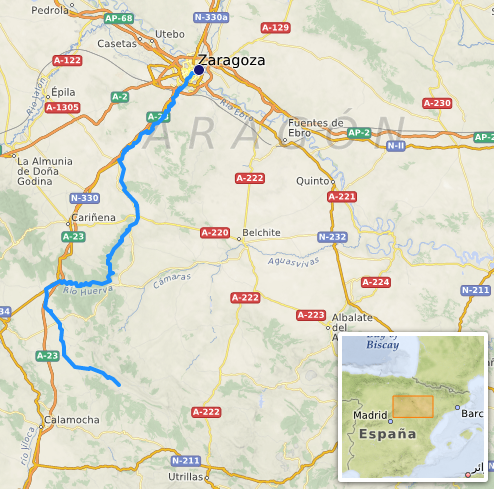

Location
- Country: Spain

Physical characteristics
- Source
  - location: Sierra de Cucalón, Iberian System; Jiloca Comarca, (Aragon)
  - elevation: 1,280 m (4,200 ft)
- Mouth
  - location: Ebro
  - elevation: 193 m (633 ft)
- Length: 128 km (80 mi)
- Basin size: 1,020 km^{2} (390 mi^{2})
- Discharge
  - average: 0.84 m^{3}/s (30 cu ft/s)

Basin features
- Progression: Ebro→ Balearic Sea

The Huerva River is a river in Aragon, Spain. It is a tributary of the Ebro. Its mean annual discharge is only 67 cubic hectometres (54,000 acre⋅ft).

== Course ==
This 128-kilometre (80 mi) long river rises in the Sierra de Cucalón, near Fonfría in the Jiloca Comarca. Flowing northwestwards near Lagueruela and Villadoz, it increases its size near Villarreal de Huerva when it is joined by the Arroyo de Villalpando. Then it flows northeastwards past Mainar, Cerveruela, Vistabella de Huerva, Tosos (formerly Alcañiz de la Huerva), Villanueva de Huerva, Muel, Cuarte de Huerva, Cadrete and María de Huerva until its waters reach the Ebro at Zaragoza, where is called 'La Huerva'.

== Ecology ==
The Huerva is relatively little polluted in its upper course, hence endangered species like the Austropotamobius pallipes crayfish and fishes like Barbus haasi, Rutilus arcasii and Chondrostoma toxostoma are to be found in its waters.

== See also ==
- List of rivers of Spain
