= Manchones =

- Municipality and village
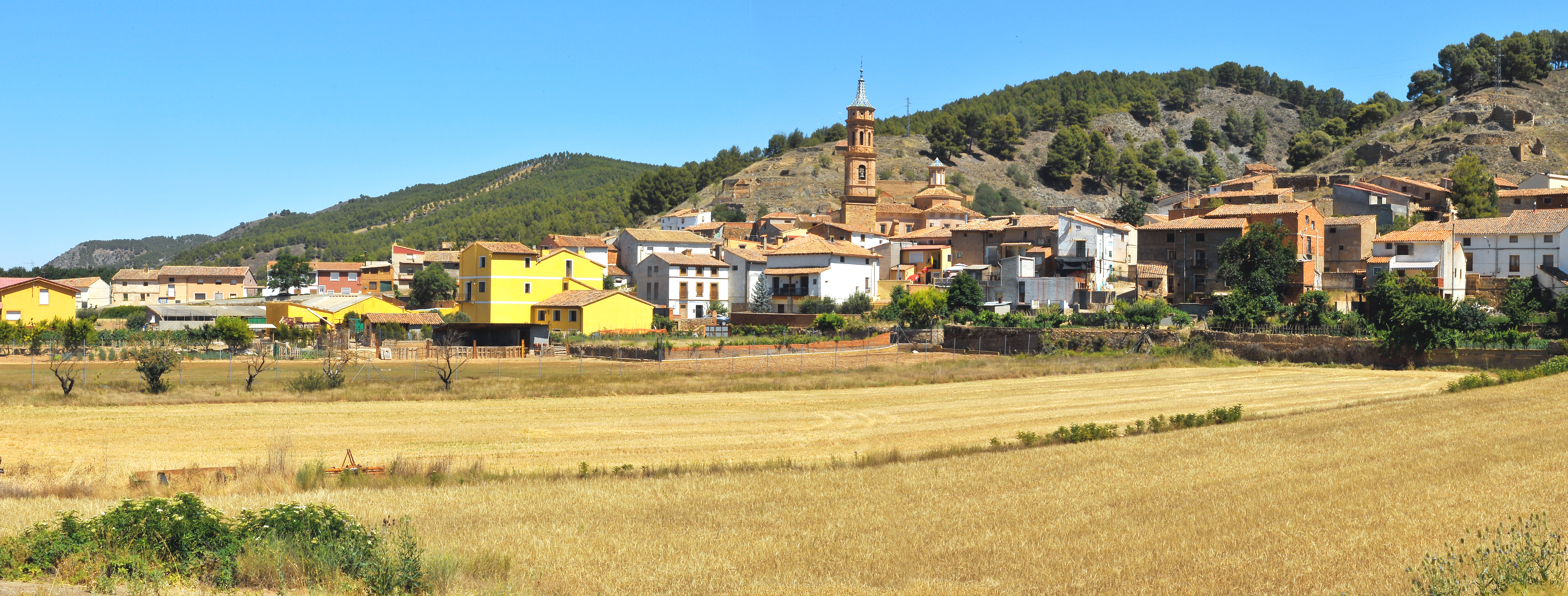

- Flag Coat of arms

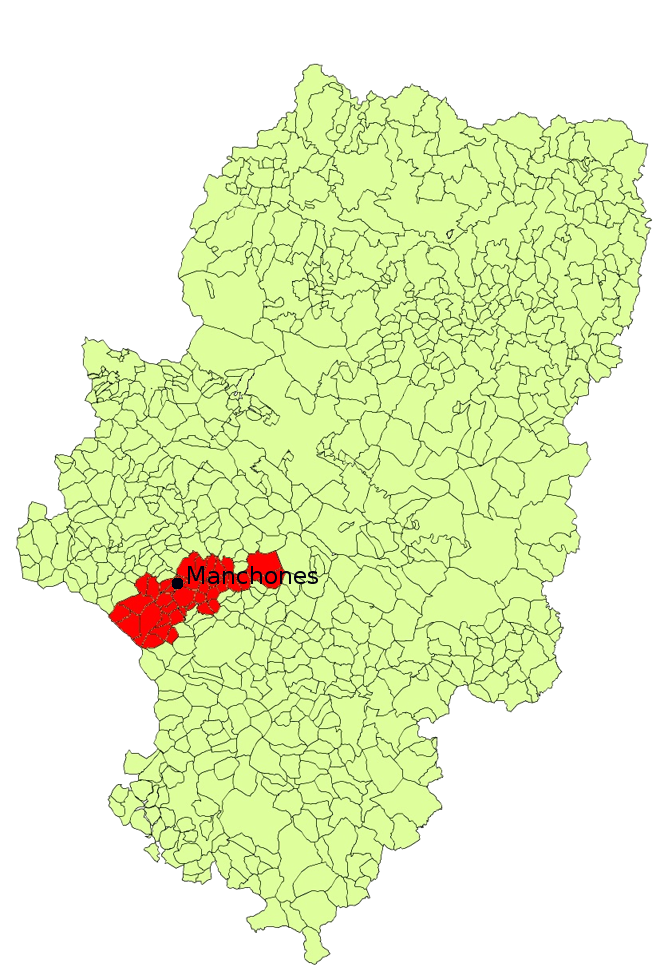
- Location of Machones within Campo de Daroca in Aragon

- Location in Spain
- Coordinates: 41°09′N 1°28′W
- Country: Spain
- Autonomous community: Aragon
- Province: Zaragoza
- Comarca: Campo de Daroca

Government
  - Alcade: Jesús Pardillos Julián

Area
  - Total: 27 km^{2} (10 sq mi)
- Elevation: 756 m (2,480 ft)

Population (2025-01-01)
  - Total: 91
  - Density: 3.4/km^{2} (8.7/sq mi)
- Time zone: UTC+1 (CET)
  - Summer (DST): UTC+2 (CEST)
- Postcode: 50366
- Area code: 976

Manchones is a municipality in the province of Zaragoza, Aragon, Spain. According to the Spanish Statistical Institute (INE), the municipality had a population of 123 inhabitants in 2010. The pueblo is in the comarca of Campo de Daroca, about 6 kilometres (3.7 mi) northwest of Daroca and just southeast of Murero in the Calatayud-Daroca depression. The Jiloca River passes to the west.

The parish church is dedicated to the Conversion of St Paul. There are some remnants of defensive walls from the time of the Reconquista, when Alfonso the Battler, king of Aragon, forced a route through towards Valencia from Zaragoza.

== Situation ==
Manchones is a small settlement situated at the base of a hill in the valley of the river Jiloca, between Calatayud and Daroca. The pueblo lies on an ancient route between the Meseta Central, the Ebro and the coast of the Levante, which was certainly established in Roman times.

== History ==
Prehistoric remains have been found in the area and there is some evidence of Celtiberian settlement in Manchones. It has been suggested that the name of the pueblo derives from mancusos, gold coins in circulation in Aragon during the 11th century.

Diego López de Lobera, who served under Alfonso the Battler during the Reconquista, was given the castle of Manchones in 1152. In 1248, by grant from Jaime I of Aragon, Manchones was freed from its dependence on Daroca, becoming part of the Community of Daroca Villages, which was dissolved in 1838.

== Fiestas ==
The festivities in honour of St. Vincent and St. Paul are held in the last weekend of January, coinciding with the feast of St. Valero in Zaragoza, while those in honour of San Roque usually last five days, ending with the feast of the saint on 16 August. On August 15 they celebrate with a pilgrimage and a feast in the town square.

== Buildings ==
The parish church of the Conversion of St Paul was built in the eighteenth century on the site of a medieval church and was restored in 2004–2005. Its chapel is dedicated to the Virgen del Pilar which contains a late 17th-century baroque reredos. A 15th century wooden crucifix is housed in the sacristy.

Surviving remains of defensive walls and towers indicate that Manchones was part of the defensive system for Daroca.

== Famous residents ==
- Jesús Ángel Bernal Julián – actor and founder of Teatro de la Estación in Zaragoza.
- Antonio Palacios Rodrigo – (1932–1958) bullfighter.
- José Luis Roca Millán – (born 1934) past president of the Spanish Football Federation.

== See also ==
- List of municipalities in Zaragoza
