= Lechón (disambiguation) =

Lechón is a whole spit-roasted pork dish in several regions of the world.

Lechón or Lechon may also refer to:

- Lechón, Aragon, a municipality in Zaragoza Province, Aragon, Spain
- Jan Lechoń, a Polish poet, literary and theater critic, and diplomat
