= Vistabella, Zaragoza =

Vistabella
- municipality
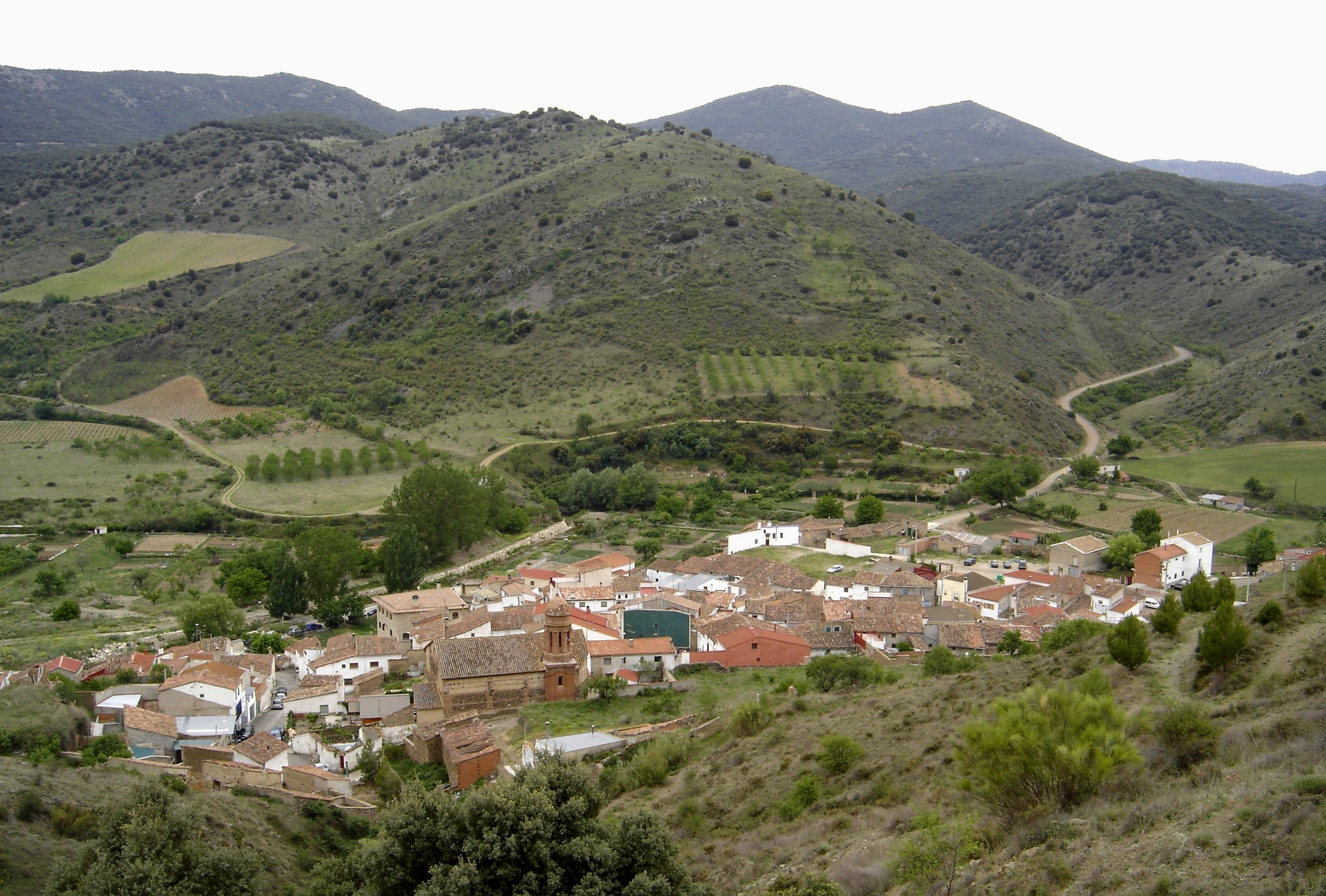

- Flag Coat of arms

- Location within Aragon Location within Spain Location within Europe
- Country: Spain
- Autonomous community: Aragon
- Province: Zaragoza
- Comarca: Campo de Cariñena

Area
  - Total: 21.8 km^{2} (8.4 sq mi)
- Elevation: 754 m (2,474 ft)

Population (2025-01-01)
  - Total: 51
  - Density: 2.3/km^{2} (6.1/sq mi)
- Time zone: CET
  - Summer (DST): UTC+1
- Postal code: 50482

Vistabella, also known as Vistabella de Huerva, is a municipality in the province of Zaragoza, Aragon. According to the 2010 census, the municipality has a population of 50 inhabitants.

The town is named after the Huerva River.

== Photogallery ==
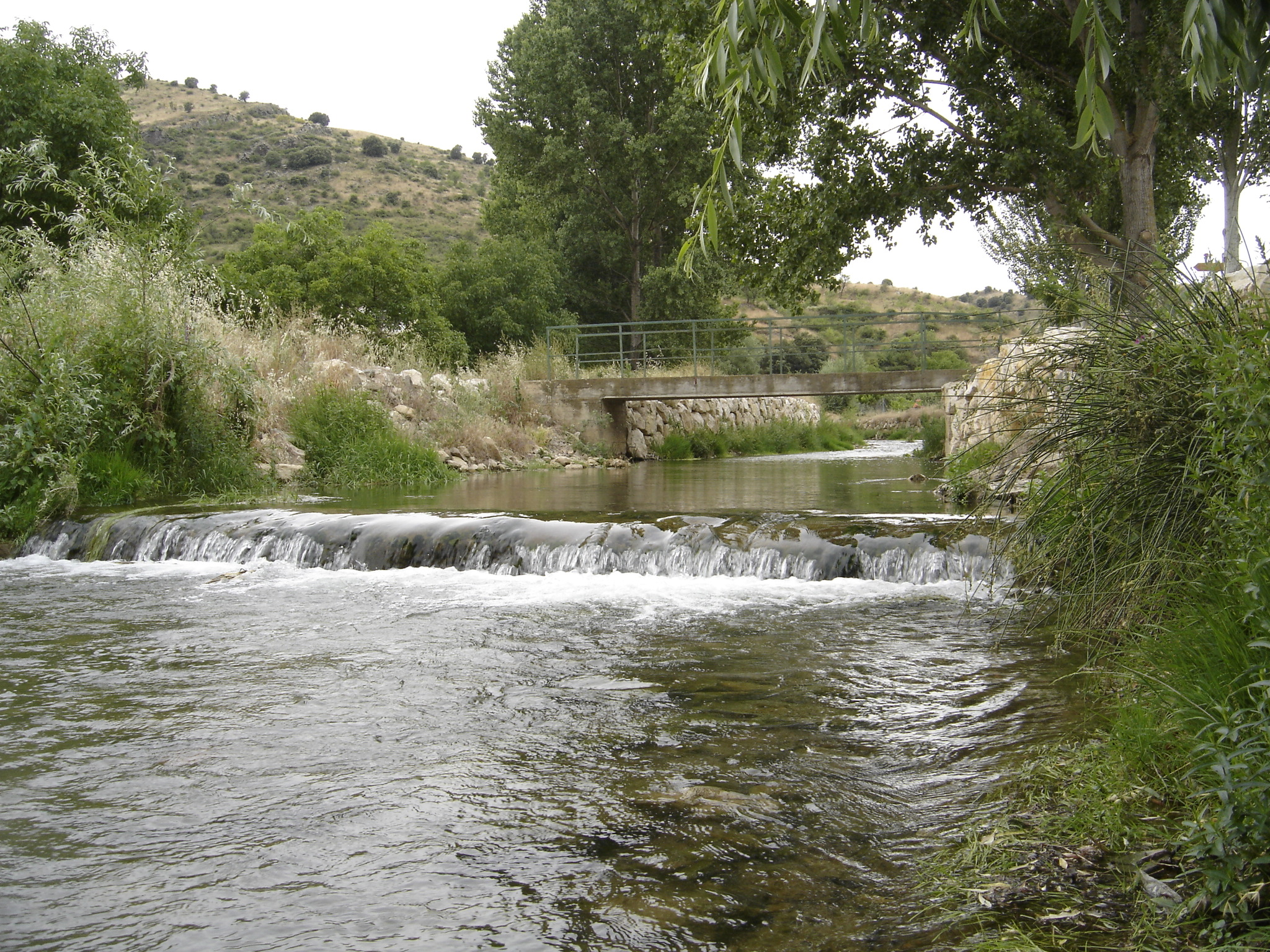
Huerva River in Vistabella

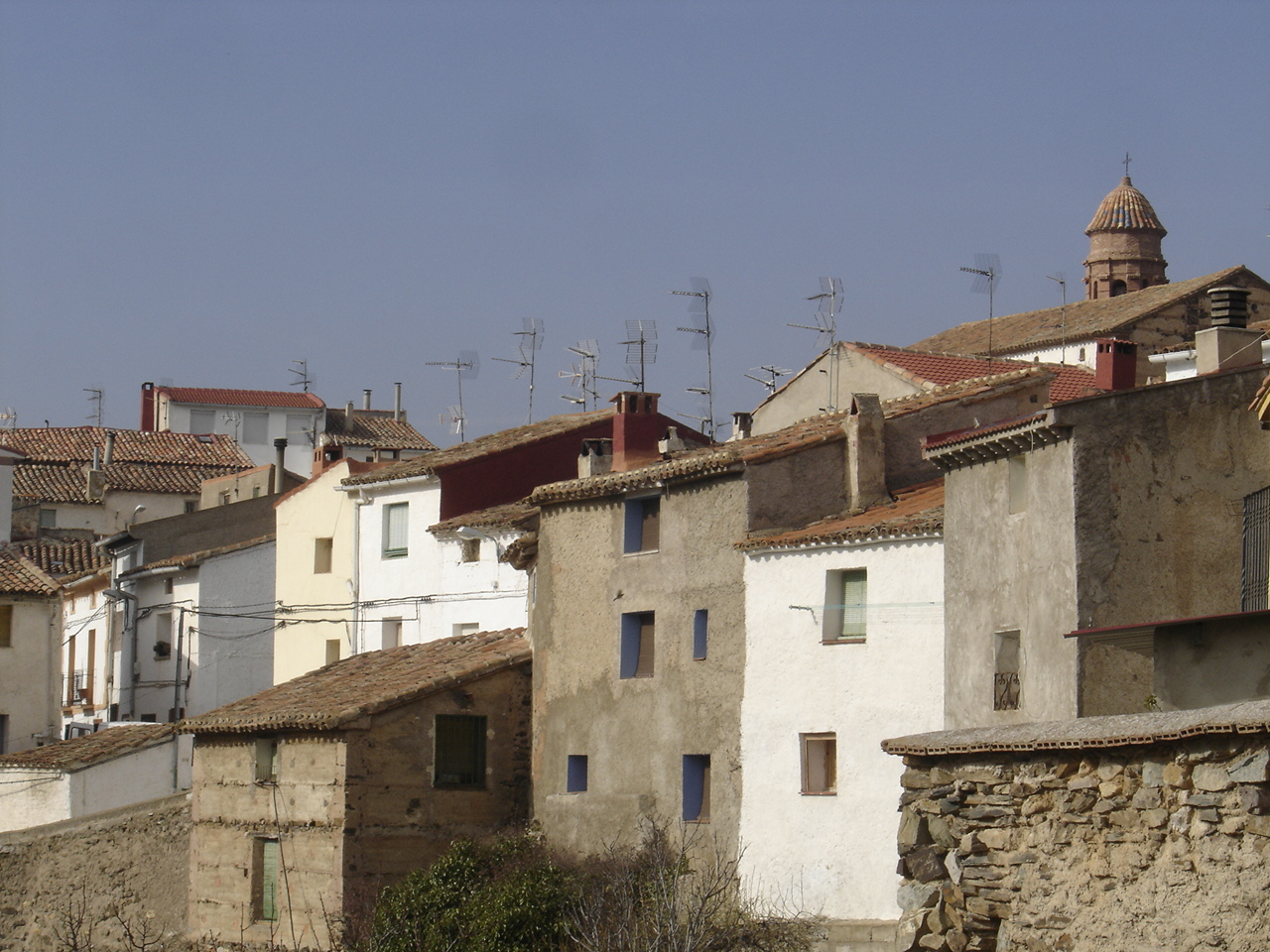
View of the town

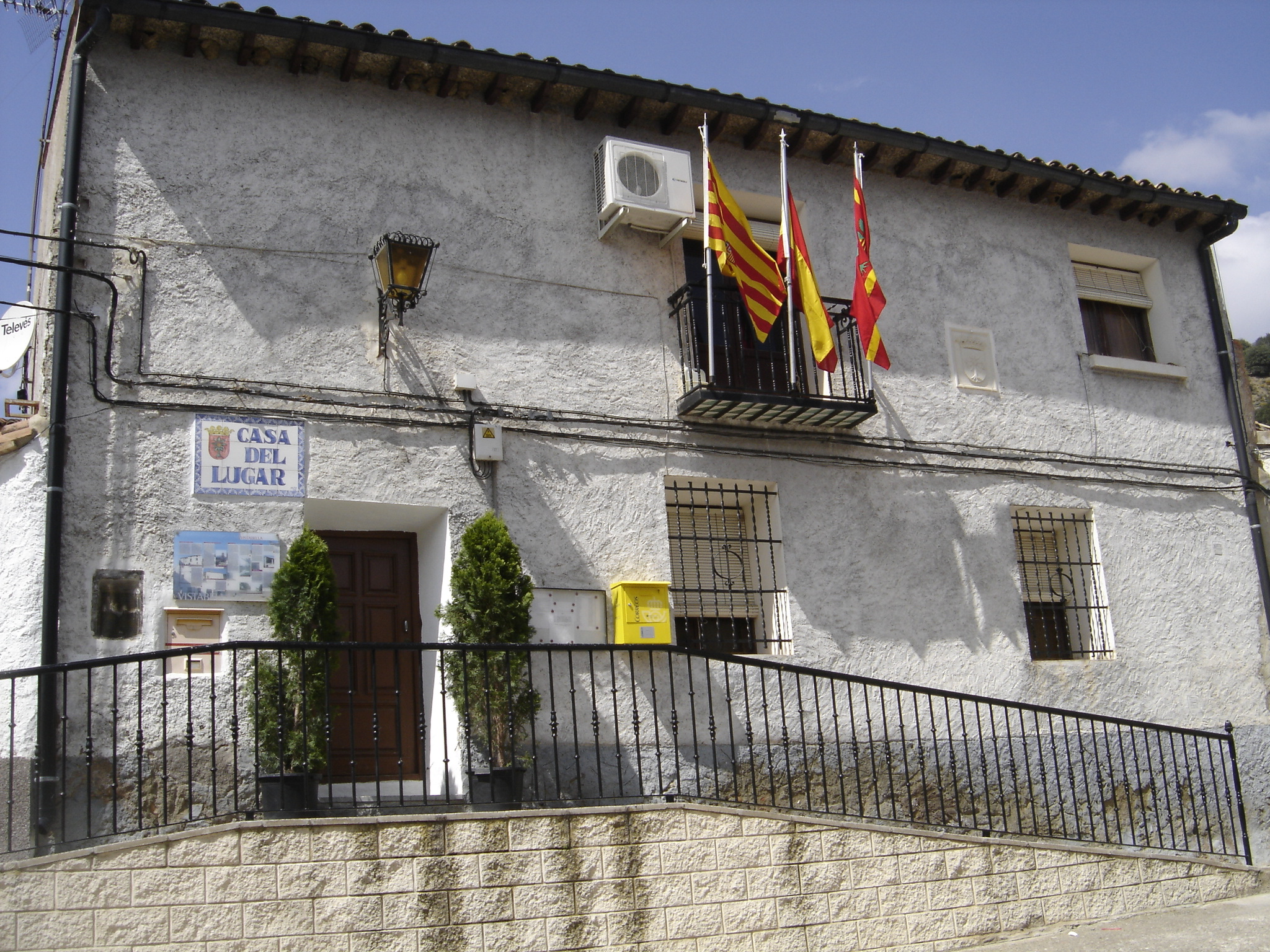
Casa del Lugar

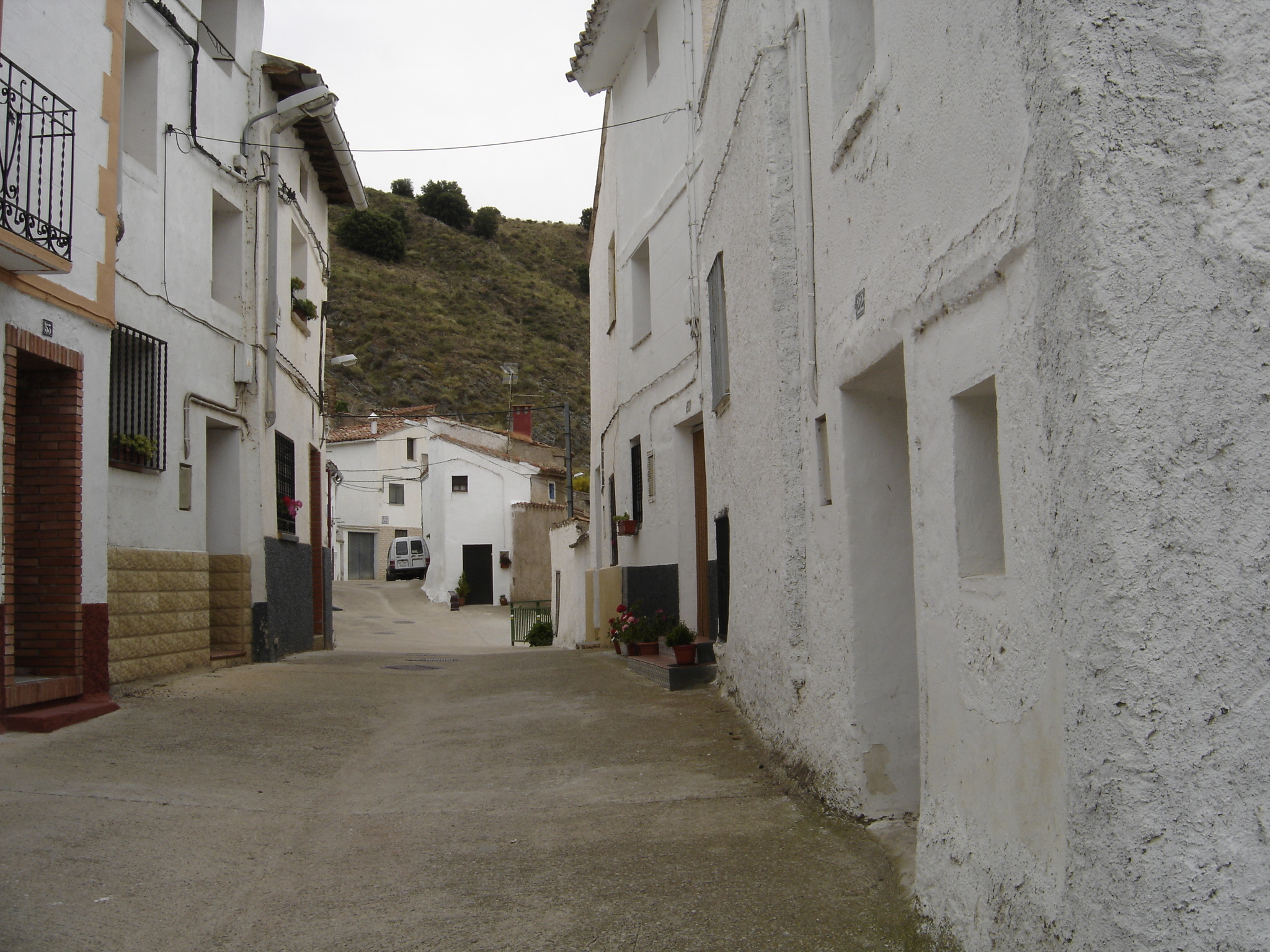
Las Casas Bajas

== See also ==
- List of municipalities in Zaragoza
