= Used, Zaragoza =

Coordinates: 41°03′N 1°33′W

Used
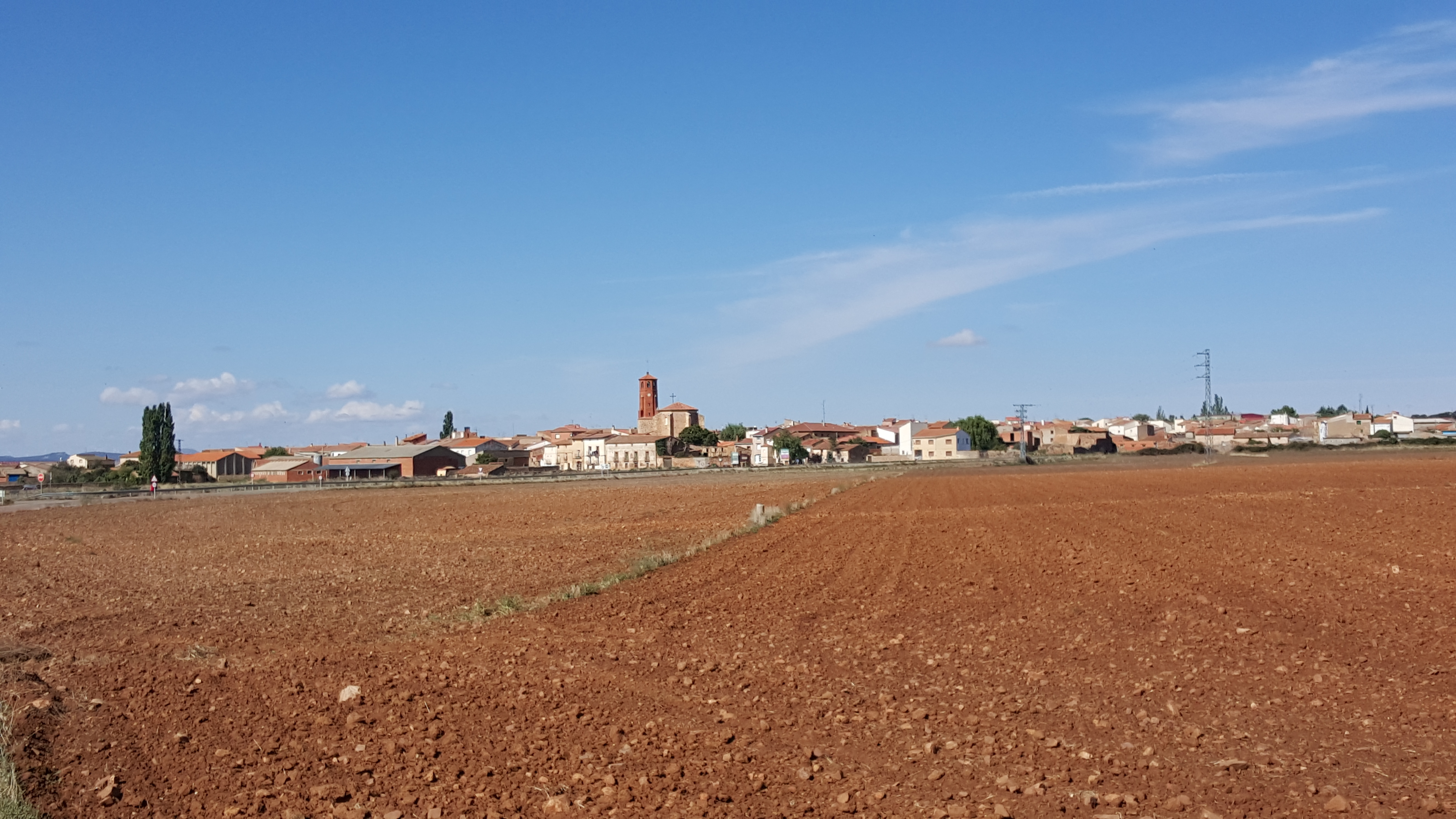

- Flag Coat of arms
- Interactive map of Used
- Country: Spain
- Autonomous community: Aragon
- Province: Zaragoza
- Comarca: Campo de Daroca

Area
  - Total: 85.3 km^{2} (32.9 sq mi)
- Elevation: 1,050 m (3,440 ft)

Population (2025-01-01)
  - Total: 250
- Time zone: CET
  - Summer (DST): UTC+1
- Postal code: 50374

Used is a municipality in the province of Zaragoza, Aragon, Spain. According to the 2010 census (INE), the municipality has a population of 328 inhabitants.

It is located in the Campo de Daroca comarca near the Sierra de Santa Cruz.

== Location and climate ==
Used is located approximately 115 km (71 mi) by road southwest of the provincial capital Zaragoza, at an elevation of about 1,050 m (3,445 ft).

== Population ==
Year	1970	1981	1991	2001	2011	2021
Population	658	462	453	376	321	271

== See also ==
- List of municipalities in Zaragoza
