= Laguna de Gallocanta =

Lake in Spain

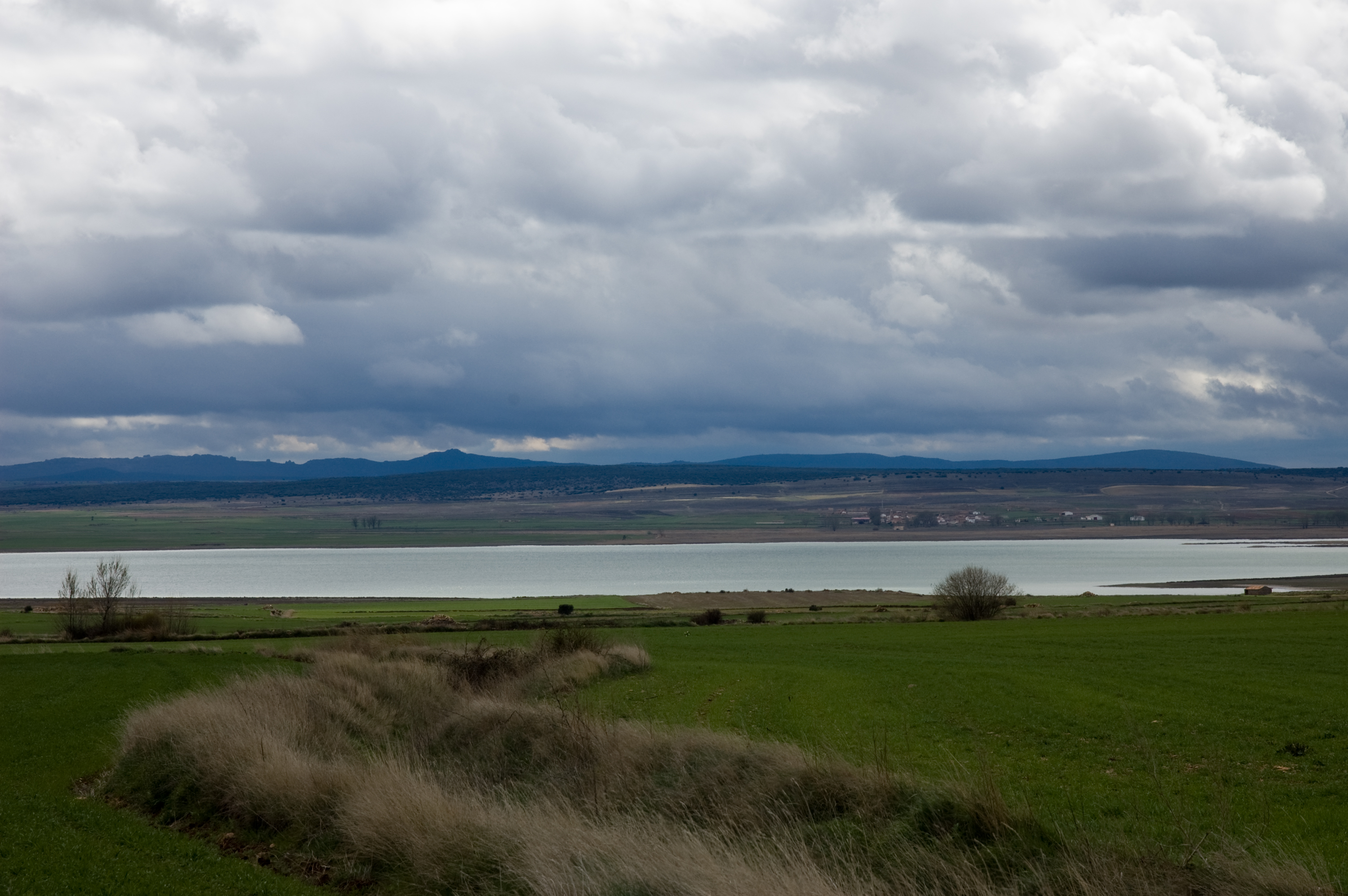

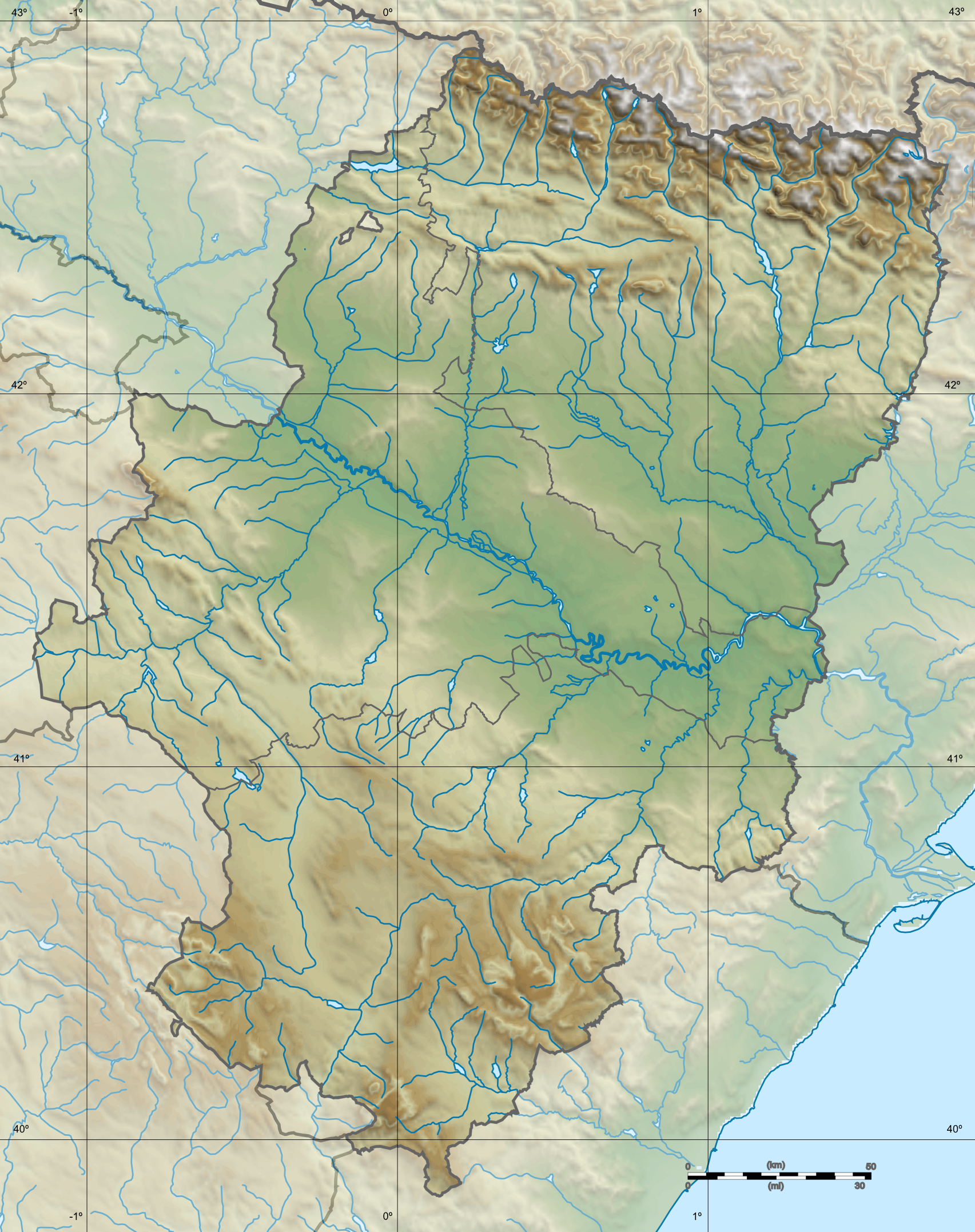
- Location within Aragon
- Location: Campo de Daroca and Jiloca Comarca, Aragon
- Coordinates: 40°58′00″N 1°29′50″W
- Primary inflows: Río de la Hoz de los Pozuelos, Arroyo de Cañada, Arroyo de Santed
- Primary outflows: None
- Catchment area: 543.35 km^{2} (209.79 sq mi)
- Basin countries: Spain
- Max. length: 7.7 km (4.8 mi)
- Max. width: 2.8 km (1.7 mi)
- Surface area: 14.6 km^{2} (5.6 sq mi)
- Average depth: 0.5 m (1.6 ft)
- Max. depth: 2 m (6 ft 7 in)
- Water volume: 5×10^{6} m^{3} (180×10^{6} cu ft)
- Surface elevation: 995 m (3,264 ft)
- Settlements: Bello, Gallocanta, Berrueco, Tornos and Las Cuerlas

Ramsar Wetland
- Designated: 7 June 1994
- Reference no.: 655

The Gallocanta Lake (Spanish: Laguna de Gallocanta) is an endorheic lake in Aragon, Spain. It is located between the Teruel and Zaragoza provinces. The lake is located just to the south of Gallocanta village, between the Aragonese comarcas of Campo de Daroca and Comarca del Jiloca. This lake is situated on a high continental plain at an altitude of almost 1,000 m.

It lies in a 53,600 ha natural basin known as El Campo de Bello, encircled by the Iberian System mountain ranges of Sierra de Santa Cruz and Sierra de Pardos in the north, Sierra Menera in the south and Sierra del Caldereros in the east. It is an intermittent rain-fed lake, largely dependent on abundant autumnal and spring rains if it is to maintain a sizeable amount of water into the hot summer months. During the summer of 1969 drought the lake dried completely, leaving a crust of salt.

== Ecology ==
The migration phenology of common cranes in southwestern Europe is changing due to climate change. The Laguna de Gallocanta remains one of the most important stopover sites for this species in Europe, being able to give shelter to an average population of 30,000 birds at one time between December and February. Researchers have characterised the cranes in Laguna de Gallocanta as "Bayesian foragers". They use Bayesian decision-making principles to optimize their foraging behavior, trading off maximization of food intake rate with benefits of remaining in a flock. The birds followed simple rate-maximizing rules only in patches where energy return was slower than that needed to meet 24-h requirements. However, they left rich patches earlier than expected probably sacrificing intake rate to remain in the foraging flock.

The lake holds a wide array of wetland birds when its water level permits, while its shores are visited by steppeland birds and raptors.

=== Protected areas ===
In the 1970s Gallocanta Lake was designated a National Hunting Reserve (Refugio Nacional de Caza de la Laguna de Gallocanta).

In 1994 Gallocanta Lake was declared a Ramsar site, protecting an area of 6,720 ha as a wetland of international importance. The lake has also received designations specifically for its importance to birdlife:

- it has been declared a Special Protection Area by the European Union.
- it is an Important Bird Area (IBA). Following an assessment in 2016, the lake was one of a number of sites classed as an IBA in danger in 2017.

== Tourism ==
There is an interpretation centre with displays on the lake's geology and wildlife. There are also private initiatives promoting bird tourism.

== See also ==
- Gallocanta
- List of Ramsar sites in Spain
- List of Ramsar wetlands of international importance
