= Anento =

- municipality
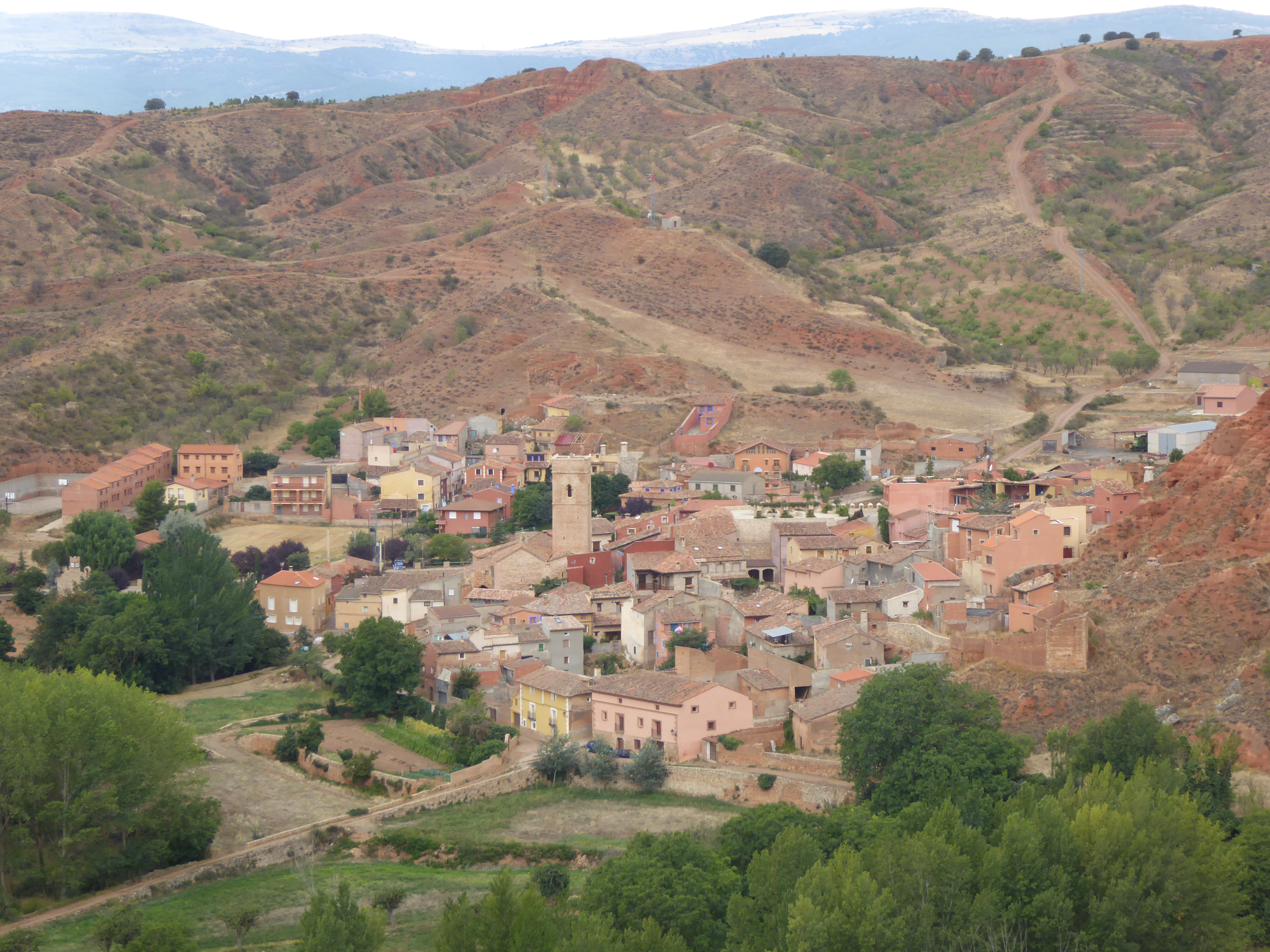

- Flag Coat of arms

- Location within Aragon Location within Spain Location within Europe
- Country: Spain
- Autonomous community: Aragon
- Province: Zaragoza
- Municipality: Anento

Area
  - Total: 21 km^{2} (8.1 sq mi)

Population (2025-01-01)
  - Total: 117
  - Density: 5.6/km^{2} (14/sq mi)
- Time zone: UTC+1 (CET)
  - Summer (DST): UTC+2 (CEST)

Anento is a municipality located in the Campo de Daroca comarca, province of Zaragoza, Aragon, Spain. According to the 2004 census (INE), the municipality has a population of 198 inhabitants.

== See also ==
- List of municipalities in Zaragoza
