= Tornos =

- municipality
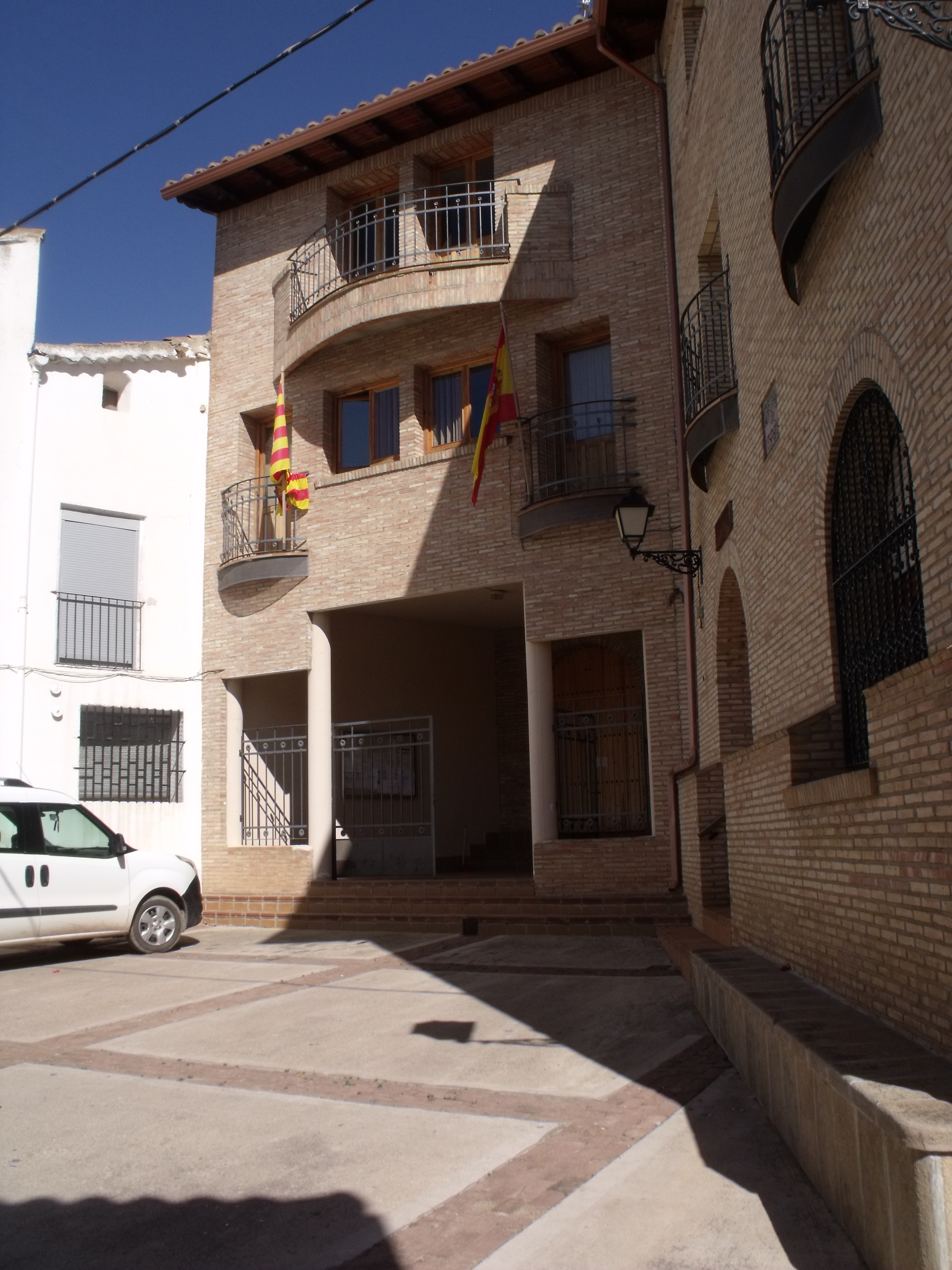
- Town hall

- Location within Spain
- Coordinates: 40°58′N 1°26′W
- Country: Spain
- Autonomous community: Aragon
- Province: Teruel
- Comarca: Jiloca

Area
  - Total: 48 km^{2} (19 sq mi)

Population (2025-01-01)
  - Total: 175
  - Density: 3.6/km^{2} (9.4/sq mi)
- Time zone: UTC+1 (CET)
  - Summer (DST): UTC+2 (CEST)

Tornos is a municipality located in the province of Teruel, Aragon, Spain. According to the 2004 census (INE), the municipality has a population of 239 inhabitants.

This town is located close to the Laguna de Gallocanta natural lake.

== See also ==
- List of municipalities in Teruel
