= Gallocanta =

- municipality
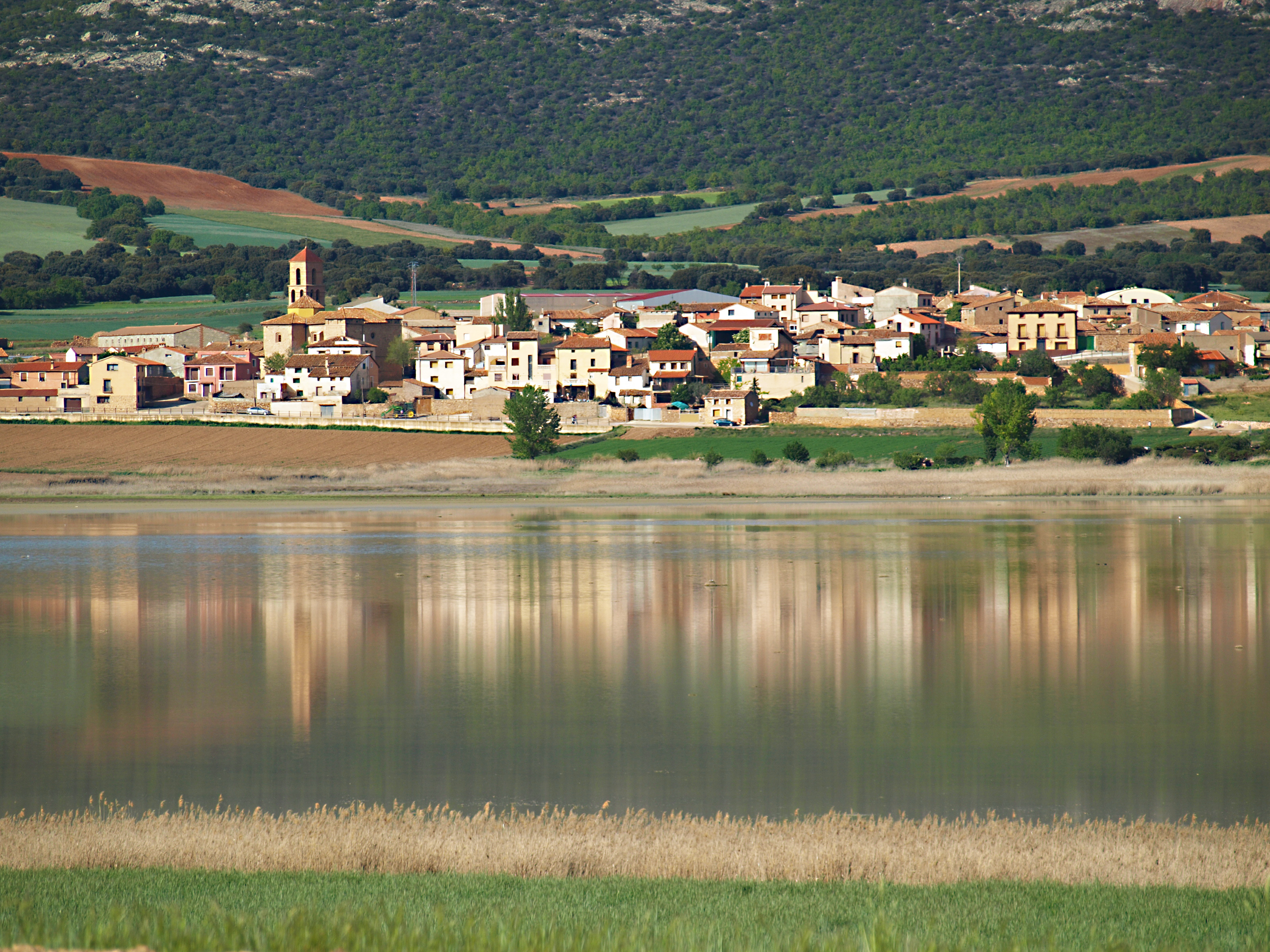

- Flag Coat of arms

- Location within Aragon Location within Spain Location within Europe
- Country: Spain
- Autonomous community: Aragon
- Province: Zaragoza
- Comarca: Campo de Daroca

Area
  - Total: 29 km^{2} (11 sq mi)

Population (2025-01-01)
  - Total: 128
  - Density: 4.4/km^{2} (11/sq mi)
- Time zone: UTC+1 (CET)
  - Summer (DST): UTC+2 (CEST)

Gallocanta is a municipality located in the province of Zaragoza, Aragon, Spain. According to the 2004 census (INE), the municipality has a population of 158 inhabitants.

Just to the south of the village is the Laguna de Gallocanta, an endorheic lake.

== Gallocanta lake ==
The lake of Gallocanta is situated on a high continental plain at an altitude of just over 1,000m. It is a purely rain-fed lagoon which is largely dependent on autumn and spring rains if it is to maintain much water into the hot summer months.

Apart from being the most important single stopover site for migrating Common Crane in Spain, it holds an interesting array of wetland birds when its water level permits, while its shores are visited by steppeland birds and raptors. The European Union has designated it as a Special Protection Area.

== See also ==
- List of municipalities in Zaragoza
