= Battle of Villar de los Navarros =

Battle of the First Carlist War

- Part of First Carlist War
Date	24 August 1837
Location	Villar de los Navarros, Aragon, Spain
Result	Carlist victory

Belligerents
Carlists supporting Infante Carlos of Spain	Liberals (Isabelinos or Cristinos) supporting Isabella II of Spain and her regent mother Maria Christina

Commanders and leaders
Don Carlos	Don Ramón Solano

Strength
11,000 infantry; 100 cavalry	Slightly over half the Carlist force

Casualties and losses
1,245 taken prisoner	

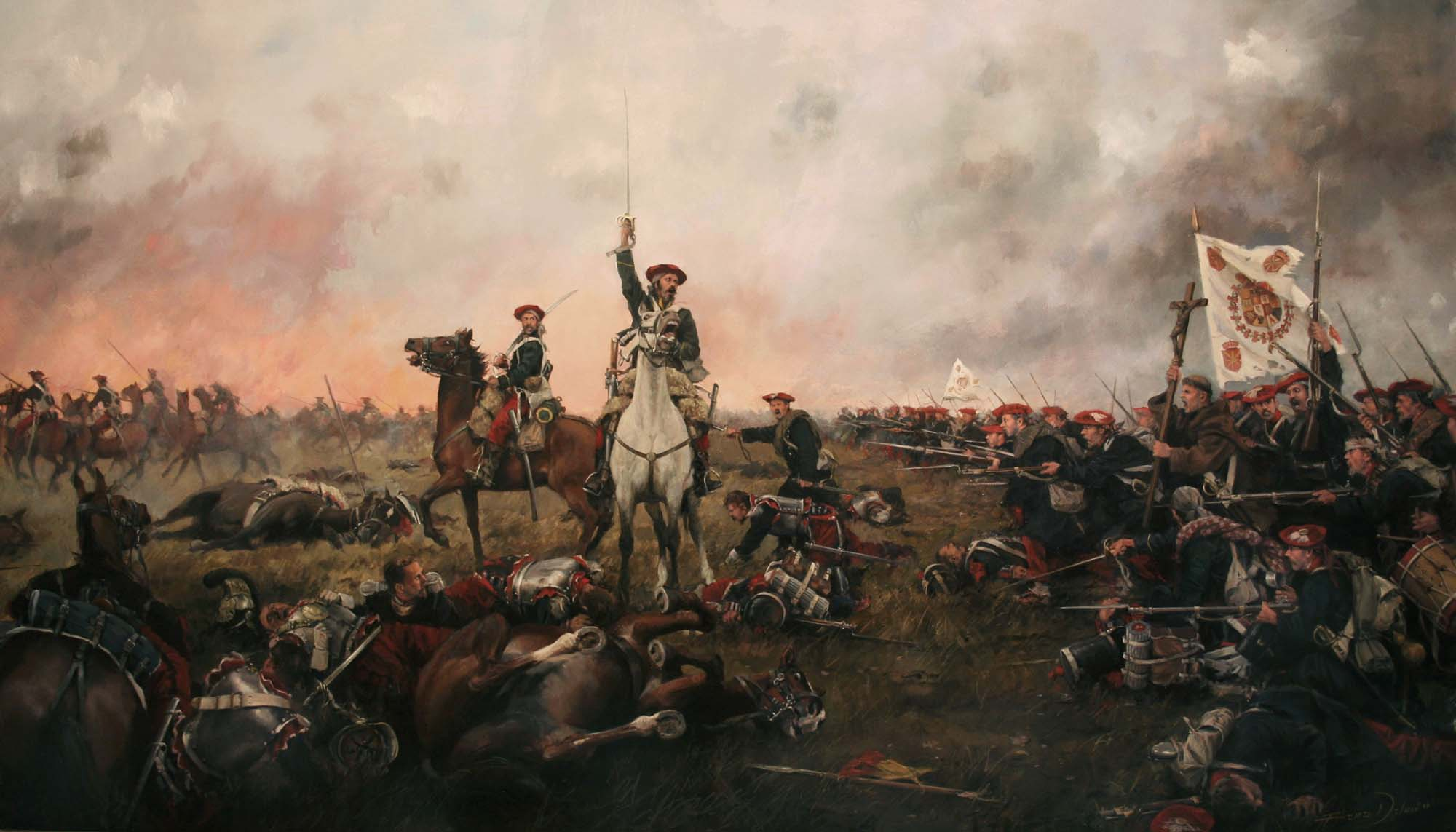
Painting "Calderote" (First Carlist War) by Ferrer Dalmau, depicting the Carlist victory at the Battle of Villar de los Navarros (1837)

The Battle of Villar de los Navarros (August 24, 1837) was a battle of the First Carlist War. It occurred near the town of Villar de los Navarros in Zaragoza Province and was a victory for the Carlists.

The Carlists took many prisoners, including the brigadier Ramón Solano, 84 officers, 60 sergeants, and 1,500 infantrymen; 400 of whom were forced to join the Carlist army.

1,245 prisoners, many badly wounded, were taken on the night of August 24 to the towns of Herrera de los Navarros and Villar de los Navarros. These prisoners, called los prisioneros de Herrera, were stripped completely naked and despoiled of all of their possessions.

On August 25, the Carlist army departed from Villar with this contingent of prisoners. The Carlist army included the Briton adventurer C.F. Henningsen.
