= Badules =

- municipality
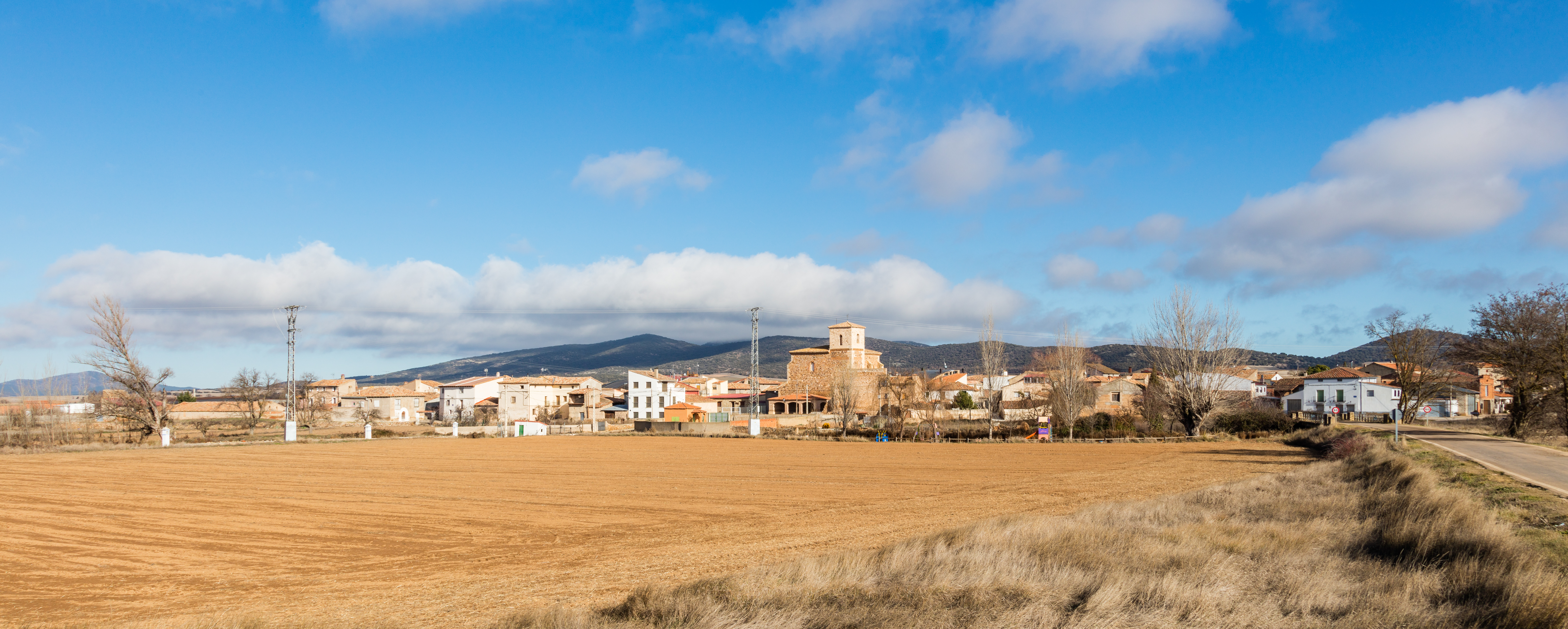

- Flag Coat of arms

- Location within Aragon Location within Spain Location within Europe
- Coordinates: 41°9′N 1°15′W
- Country: Spain
- Autonomous community: Aragon
- Province: Zaragoza
- Comarca: Campo de Daroca

Area
  - Total: 19 km^{2} (7.3 sq mi)

Population (2025-01-01)
  - Total: 83
  - Density: 4.4/km^{2} (11/sq mi)
- Time zone: UTC+1 (CET)
  - Summer (DST): UTC+2 (CEST)

Badules is a municipality located in the province of Zaragoza, Aragon, Spain. According to the 2025 annual census conducted by INE the municipality has a population of 82 inhabitants.

Badules is located in the Campo de Daroca comarca. French singer Aurora Lacasa, who became famous in the former GDR, was the daughter of a Spanish Republican journalist born in Badules who went into exile to France and later to Hungary after the Spanish Civil War.

== Gallery ==
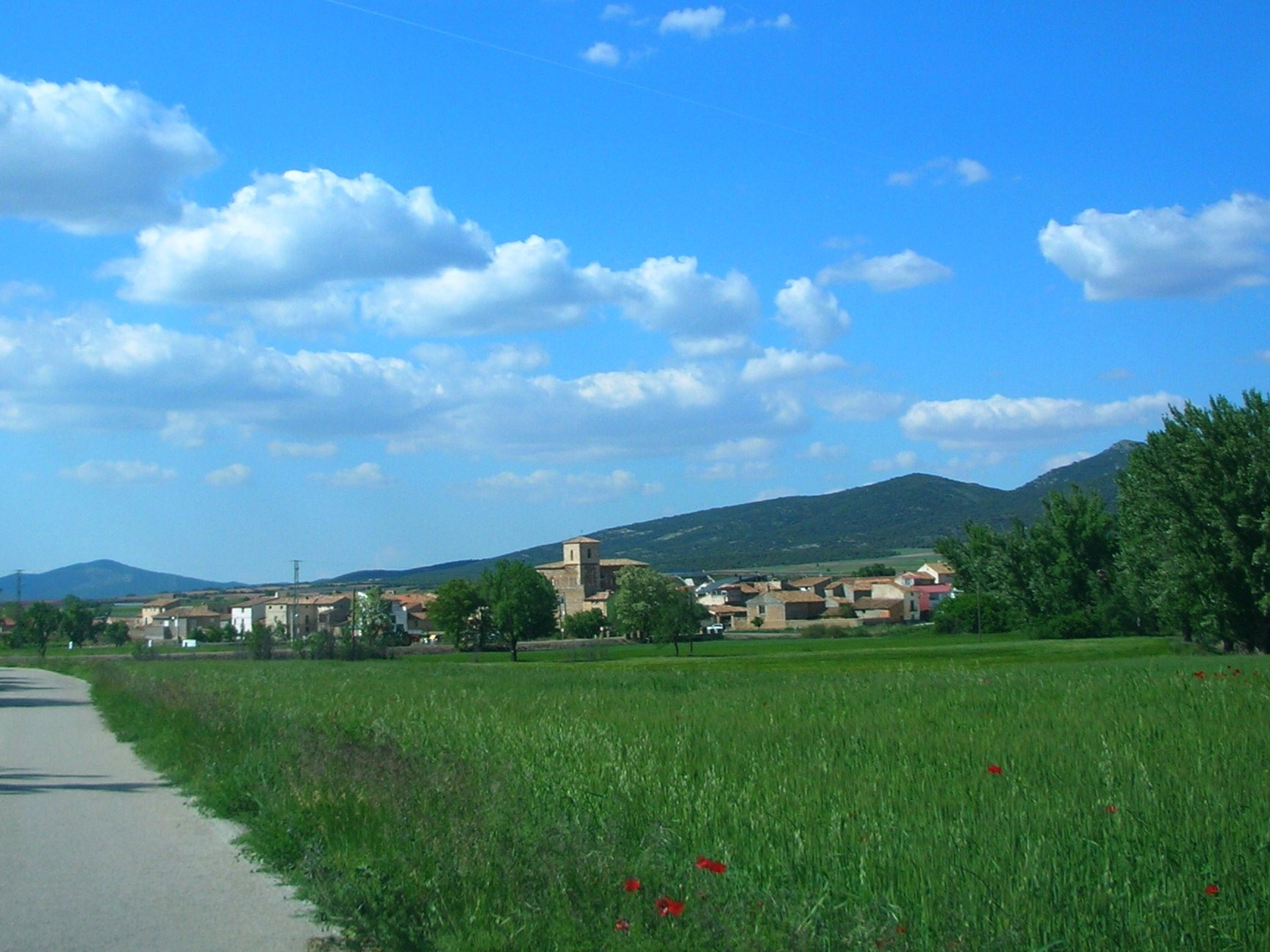
View of Badules

== See also ==
- Campo de Daroca
- List of municipalities in Zaragoza
