= Villarreal de Huerva =

- Location within Spain
- Coordinates: 41°12′N 1°17′W
- Country: Spain
- Autonomous community: Aragon
- Province: Zaragoza
- Comarca: Campo de Daroca

Area
  - Total: 27 km^{2} (10 sq mi)
- Elevation: 867 m (2,844 ft)

Population (2025-01-01)
  - Total: 270
  - Density: 10/km^{2} (26/sq mi)
- Time zone: UTC+1 (CET)
  - Summer (DST): UTC+2 (CEST)

Villarreal de Huerva is a municipality located in the province of Zaragoza, Aragon, Spain. According to the 2010 census, the municipality has a population of 202 inhabitants.

This town is named after the Huerva River.

== Gallery ==
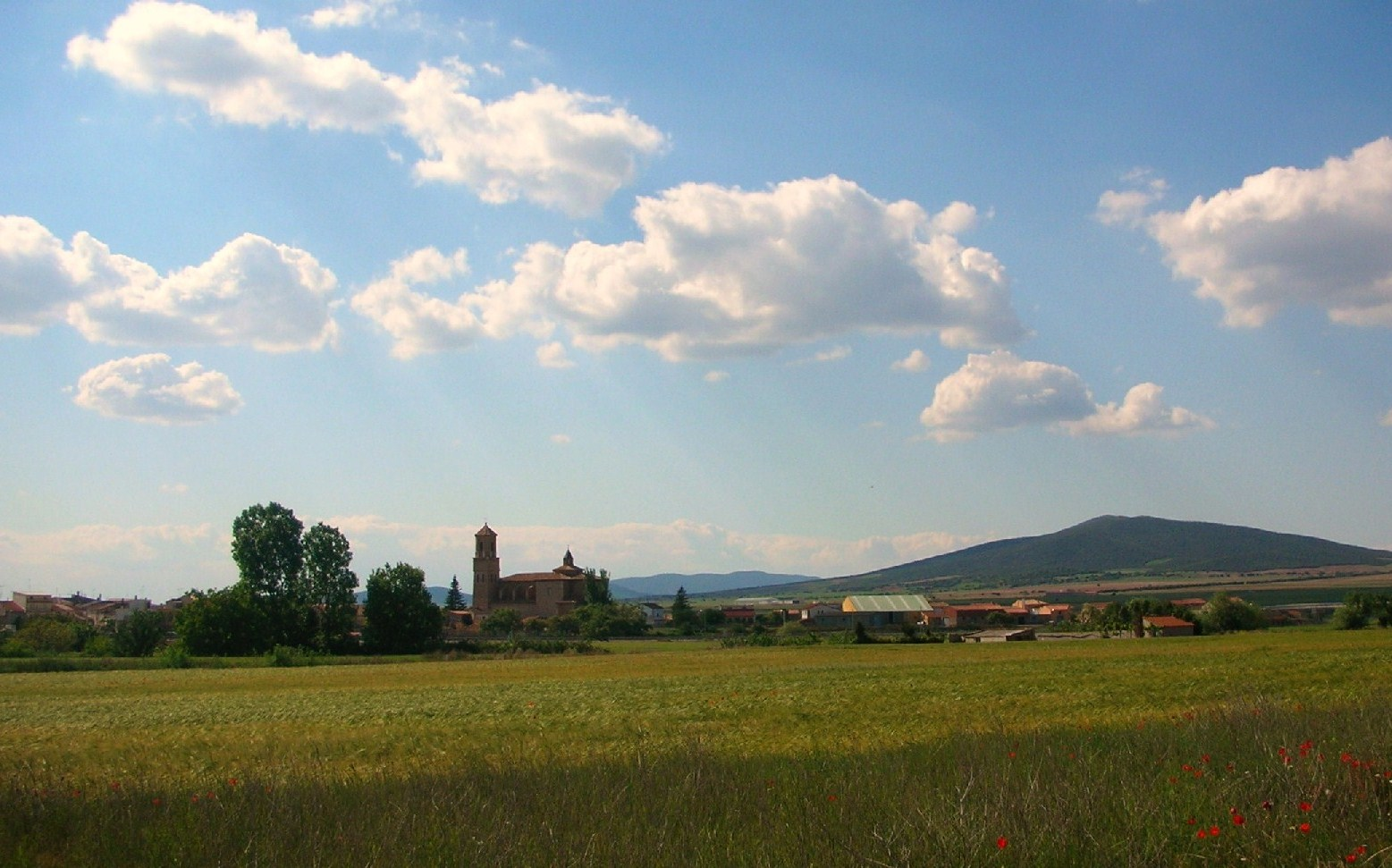
View of Villarreal de Huerva

== See also ==
- Campo de Daroca
- List of municipalities in Zaragoza
