= Villar de los Navarros =

Coordinates: 41°09′N 1°02′W

- municipality
- Flag Coat of arms
- Interactive map of Villar de los Navarros
- Country: Spain
- Autonomous community: Aragon
- Province: Zaragoza

Area
  - Total: 49 km^{2} (19 sq mi)

Population (2025-01-01)
  - Total: 147
  - Density: 3.0/km^{2} (7.8/sq mi)
- Time zone: UTC+1 (CET)
  - Summer (DST): UTC+2 (CEST)

Villar de los Navarros is a municipality located in the province of Zaragoza, Aragon, Spain. It is one of 47 municipalities of the Mudéjar Territory. According to the 2004 census (INE), the municipality has a population of 143 inhabitants. The Battle of Villar de los Navarros took place here in 1837.

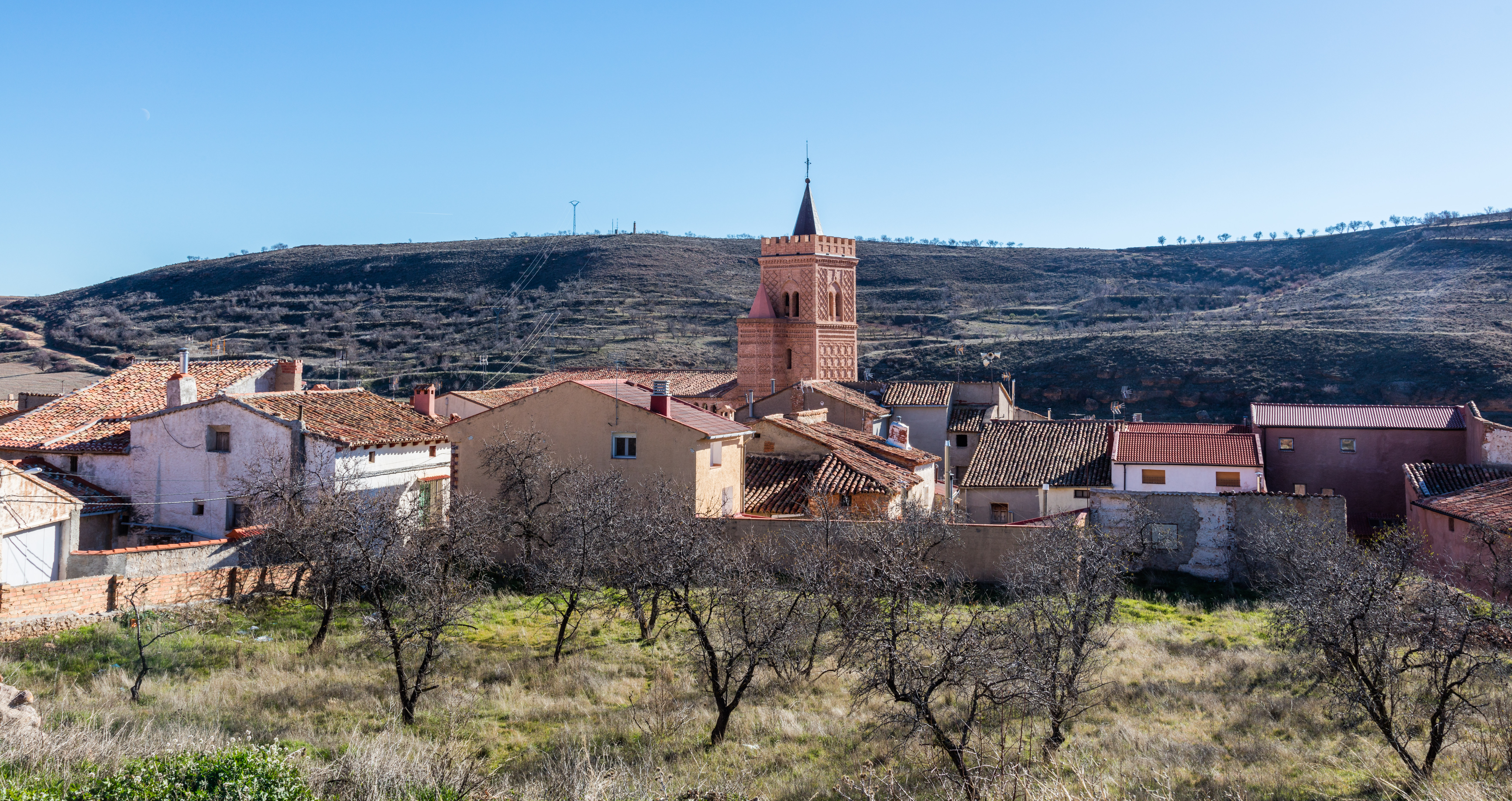
View of Villar de los Navarros, Zaragoza, Spain

== See also ==
- List of municipalities in Zaragoza
