= Berrueco =

- Municipality
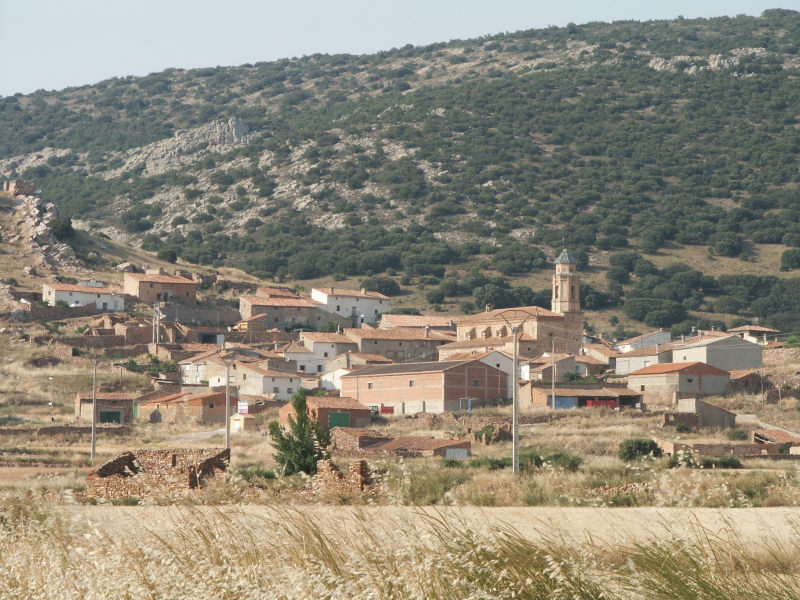

- Flag Coat of arms

- Location within Aragon Location within Spain Location within Europe
- Coordinates: 40°59′26″N 1°28′01″W
- Country: Spain
- Autonomous community: Aragon
- Province: Zaragoza

Population (2025-01-01)
  - Total: 32
- Time zone: UTC+1 (CET)
  - Summer (DST): UTC+2 (CEST)

Berrueco is a small village, overlooking the Laguna de Gallocanta in Zaragoza province, Spain, about 90 km southwest of Zaragoza.

Evidence of the Celt-Iberian settlement that predates the village is visible to the south of the village.

== See also ==
- List of municipalities in Zaragoza
