= Lechón, Aragon =

Lechón
- municipality
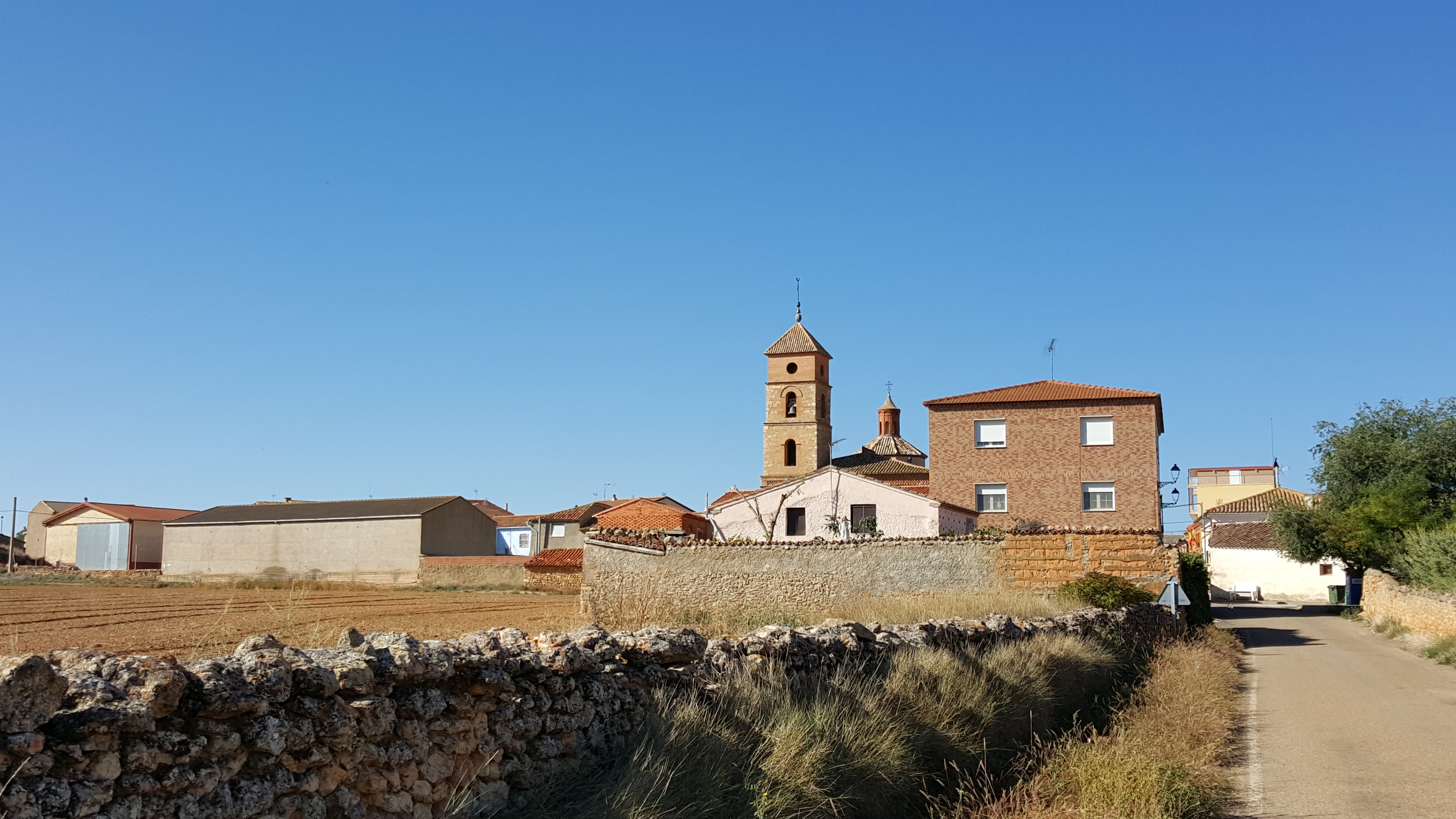

- Coat of arms

- Location within Aragon Location within Spain Location within Europe
- Coordinates: 41°5′N 1°17′W
- Country: Spain
- Autonomous community: Aragon
- Province: Zaragoza
- Comarca: Campo de Daroca

Area
  - Total: 17.46 km^{2} (6.74 sq mi)
- Elevation: 985 m (3,232 ft)

Population (2025-01-01)
  - Total: 39
- Time zone: UTC+1 (CET)
  - Summer (DST): UTC+2 (CEST)

Lechón is a municipality located in the province of Zaragoza, Aragon, Spain. According to the 2010 census, the municipality has a population of 57 inhabitants. Its postal code is 50369.

== See also ==
- Campo de Daroca
- List of municipalities in Zaragoza
