= Las Cuerlas =

- municipality
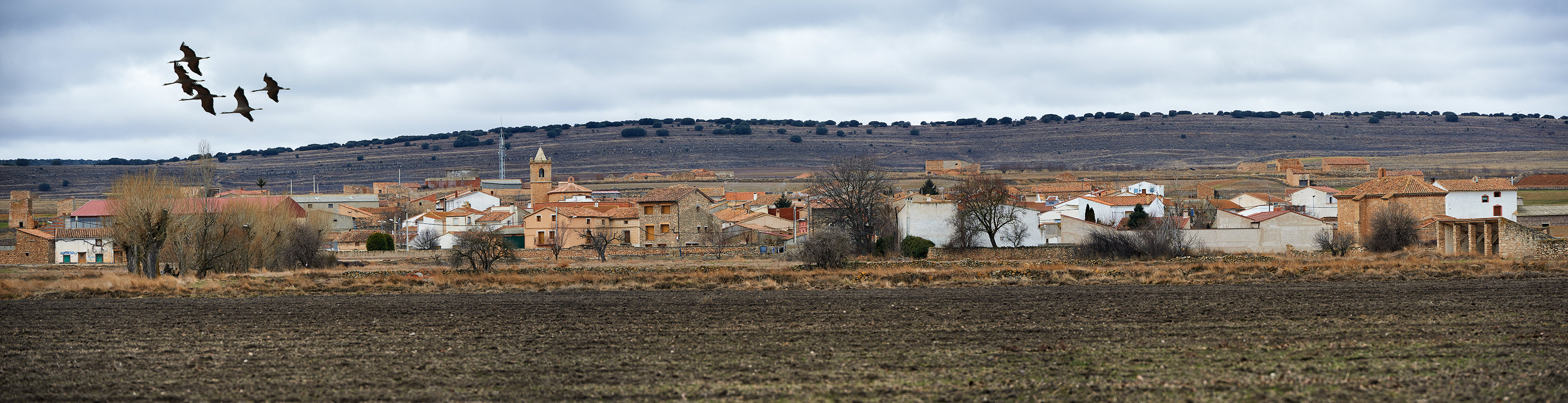

- Flag Coat of arms

- Location within Aragon Location within Spain Location within Europe
- Country: Spain
- Autonomous community: Aragon
- Province: Zaragoza

Area
  - Total: 32 km^{2} (12 sq mi)

Population (2025-01-01)
  - Total: 44
  - Density: 1.4/km^{2} (3.6/sq mi)
- Time zone: UTC+1 (CET)
  - Summer (DST): UTC+2 (CEST)

Las Cuerlas is a municipality located in the province of Zaragoza, Aragon, Spain. According to the 2004 census (INE), the municipality has a population of 95 inhabitants.

This town is located close to the Laguna de Gallocanta natural lake.

== See also ==
- List of municipalities in Zaragoza
