= Torralba de los Frailes =

Torralba de los Frailes, Spain
- municipality
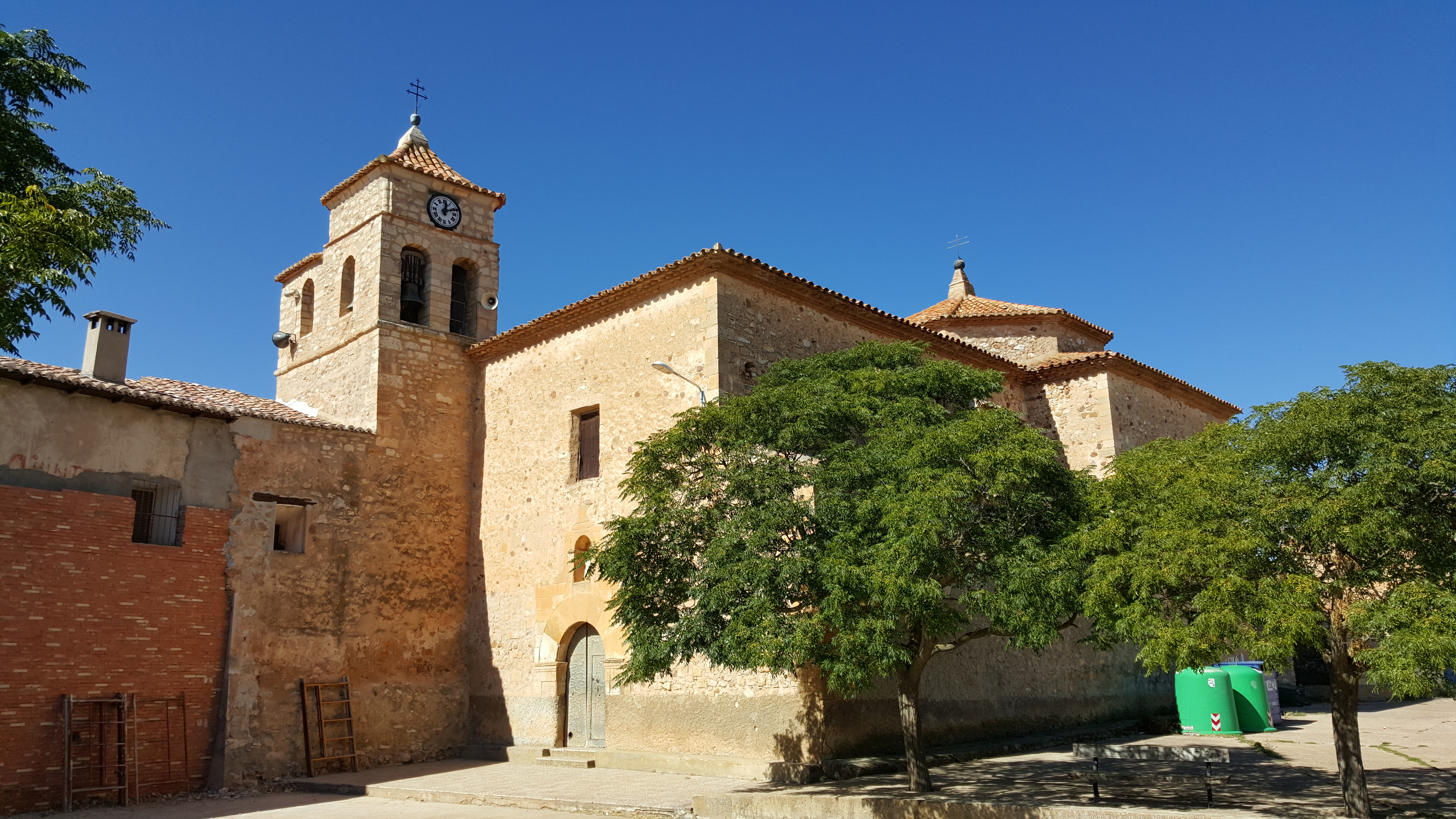
- Church of Our Lady of the Snow

- Flag Coat of arms

- Location within Spain
- Coordinates: 41°02′N 1°40′W
- Country: Spain
- Autonomous community: Aragon
- Province: Zaragoza

Area
  - Total: 59.40 km^{2} (22.93 sq mi)
- Elevation: 1,095 m (3,593 ft)

Population (2025-01-01)
  - Total: 65
  - Density: 1.1/km^{2} (2.8/sq mi)
- Time zone: UTC+1 (CET)
  - Summer (DST): UTC+2 (CEST)

Torralba de los Frailes is a municipality located in the province of Zaragoza, Aragon, Spain. According to the 2004 census (INE), the municipality had a population of 87 inhabitants.

== See also ==
- List of municipalities in Zaragoza
