= Villarroya del Campo =

- municipality
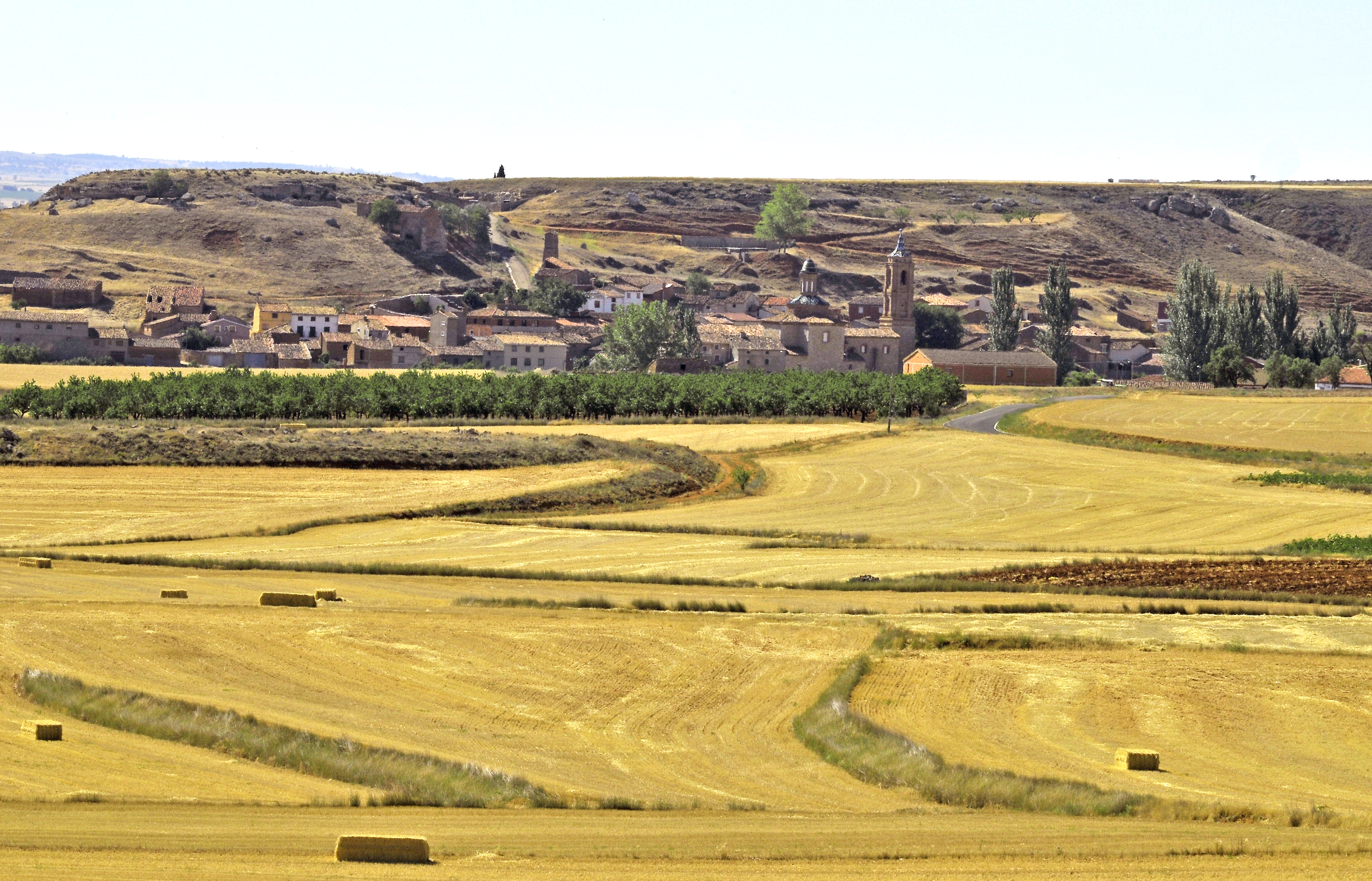

- Flag Coat of arms

- Location within Aragon Location within Spain Location within Europe
- Country: Spain
- Autonomous community: Aragon
- Province: Zaragoza
- Municipality: Villarroya del Campo

Area
  - Total: 16 km^{2} (6.2 sq mi)

Population (2025-01-01)
  - Total: 70
  - Density: 4.4/km^{2} (11/sq mi)
- Time zone: UTC+1 (CET)
  - Summer (DST): UTC+2 (CEST)

Villarroya del Campo is a municipality located in the Campo de Daroca comarca, province of Zaragoza, Aragon, Spain. According to the 2004 census (INE), the municipality has a population of 80 inhabitants.

== See also ==
- List of municipalities in Zaragoza
