= Torralbilla =

Torralbilla, Spain
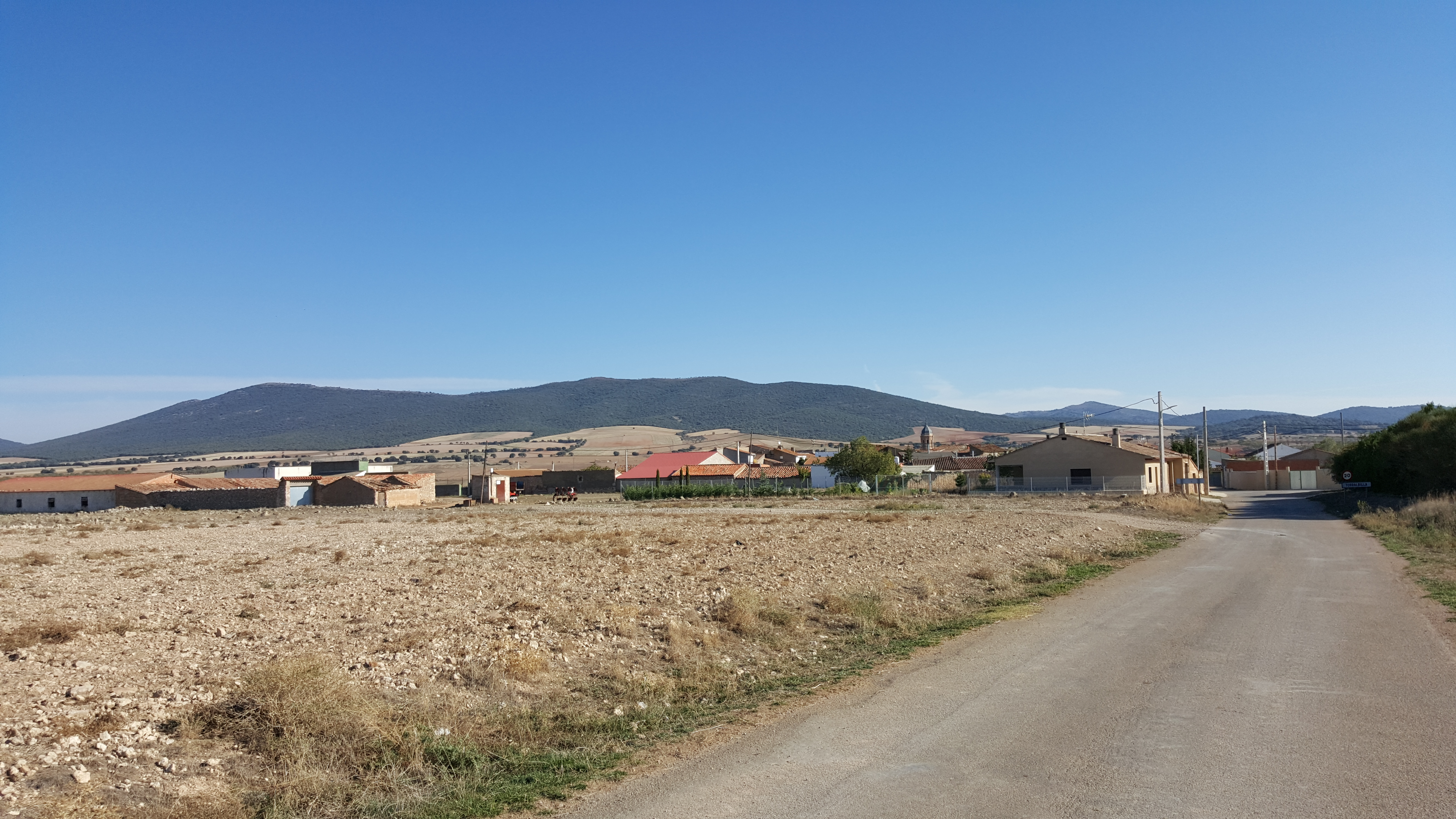
- Torralbilla

- Location within Spain
- Coordinates: 41°13′N 1°20′W
- Country: Spain
- Autonomous community: Aragon
- Province: Zaragoza
- Municipality: Torralbilla

Area
  - Total: 25 km^{2} (9.7 sq mi)
- Elevation: 882 m (2,894 ft)

Population (2025-01-01)
  - Total: 38
  - Density: 1.5/km^{2} (3.9/sq mi)
- Time zone: UTC+1 (CET)
  - Summer (DST): UTC+2 (CEST)

Torralbilla is a municipality located in the province of Zaragoza, Aragon, Spain. According to the 2004 census (INE), the municipality has a population of 71.

== History ==
In 1248, granted by Jaime I, it became a municipality autonomous from Daroca. Subsequently, Torrralbilla was added to the Sesma de Langa, being part of Comunidad de aldeas de Daroca, which depended directly on the king. This administrative regime lasted until the death of Fernando VII in 1833.

== Heritage ==
The town center has the San Lorenzo Catholic Church as one of its most significant buildings. Its baroque design dates from the 17th century. It has an octagonal tower, and a collection of altarpieces. One of the altarpieces stands out for its artistic quality and seniority, the altarpiece San Blas, from the 15th century is attributed to Juan de Bonilla. According to research by Fabián Mañas Ballestín, the altarpiece was likely painted around 1478 by Juan de Bonilla the Younger, a Gothic painter active in the Daroca area who worked alongside Miguel Jiménez on the altarpiece of the Virgin for the nearby church of Villadoz that same year. Scholars have noted the possibility that the name "Juan de Bonilla" refers to two distinct artists, possibly father and son, both active in the region during the 15th century.

Also interesting are the town hall and the two peirones dedicated to San Roque and San Ramón.

== Environment ==
The GR-90 footpath passes through Torralbilla and connects with a broader network of local trails.

Nearby you can visit interesting natural spaces, such as the view of the Chapel of the Rosary, in Villarreal de Huerva. It is also highlighted the Anento's Aguallueve, the Cambrian reservoir from Murero or Tower Campillo, in the municipality of Daroca, with four individual trees (a redwood, a pinsapo, a spruce and a cedar of Lebanon).

== See also ==
- List of municipalities in Zaragoza
