= Mainar =

Coordinates: 41°12′N 1°18′W

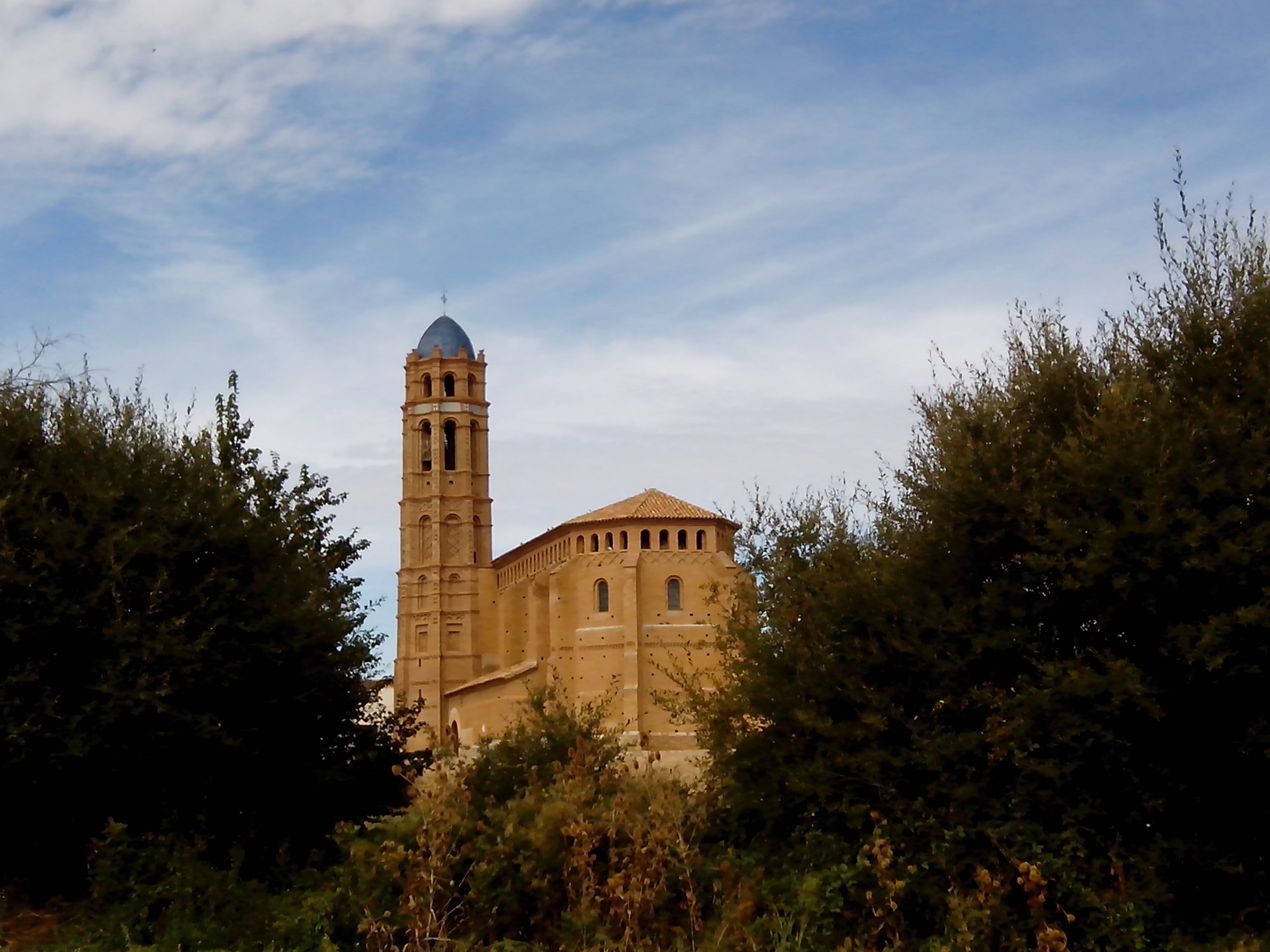

- Flag Coat of arms
- Interactive map of Mainar
- Country: Spain
- Autonomous community: Aragon
- Province: Zaragoza
- Comarca: Campo de Daroca

Government
  - Alcaldesa: María Lina Hernando Peinado (PAR)

Area
  - Total: 34.02 km^{2} (13.14 sq mi)

Population (2023)
  - Total: 176
  - Density: 5.17/km^{2} (13.4/sq mi)
- Time zone: UTC+1 (CET)
  - Summer (DST): UTC+2 (CEST)

Mainar is a municipality located in the province of Zaragoza, Aragon, Spain. According to the 2004 census (INE), the municipality has a population of 162 inhabitants.

This town is located near the Sierra de Algairén in the comarca of Campo de Daroca.

== Geography ==
Located in a small mound at the end of the plain of the same name, it is circumcised by the foothills of the Algairén mountain range, Bodegones mountain range, Pilones mountain range (also known as the Modorra Mountain Range) and Peco Mountain range.

== Hydrography ==
Huerva river crosses the municipality of Mainar, which forms the border with the town of Villarreal de Huerva.

There is also the Villarroya stream (known Valsáuco on many maps) and Villarpardo stream. two streams, although geographically known as they are not geologically because they are the result of human activity. They were created the twelfth and thirteenth centuries in drainage channels (grooves) excessively wet, and therefore are not suitable for cultivation. This can be checked by looking at the long straight sections prospective currents and perfect angles and even the cobblestones of the current in many sections, it is instead of "El Alcocer" where the artificial production is the most obvious.

The Villarpardo stream is excavated in part by differential erosion and partly by human labor between conglomerates (known as "guijo" "gravel" or "pebble") of the limestone left and right bank. Receives by the left the Rambla (the river), which in turn receives the ravine Valdelacebo left; and gets right to the gorges and Carralanga Carramanchones.

The creek receives the right Sisones the throat; and left the Cañada (throat) Alegría del Tío, the Cañada del Moro (which in turn receives the Cañada de la Vina) and the Cañada del Gordo.

In addition, there are also several irrigation canals (the acequias [irrigation ditches] "Los Ojos" and "El Reajo"); in fact, two small drainage channels, which prevents the water is used for irrigation.

An example of irrigation created exclusively for irrigation canal is the Agua Somera Somera or Vega ( "shallow" and "superficial plain"), probably from medieval times.

Special mention are the ravines ( "Barrancos") running in the town, the most important are those that flow into the Huerva river on its left bank: Barranco de la Fuente del Piojo, Barranco del Ontazo Barranco del Pozo Ropera ( formed by the union of the Barranco de los Bodegones with Dehesilla Barranco) Barranco del Despeñadero (formed by the union of the Barranco del Molinillo and Barranco Oscuro) and Barranco de Valdefrasno.

Most of them were once for the water, but after the forest policy of the former regime, excess pines touched the main flow of the currents, and it is rare that the currents have a lot of water after the spring.

== Climate ==
The climate is continental Mediterranean, very extreme: strong frosts in winter (especially in February) and outside of the heat (but not as hard as the Ebro Valley). Temperatures of 13 or 14 below zero are normal, and the record low is still much lower.

== History ==
Although Mainar existed before the twelfth century the first mention of Mainar in history are those of the repopulation of Alfonso the Battler and Pamplona, we are not Islamic and pre-Islamic very little new in the region. Most of the part of the present municipality witnessed the wanderings of San Iñigo, confessor Sancho III Major and it is well documented that withdrew into the mountains Tobed. The etymology of Mainar is clear, which is confusing because the name was chosen precisely. Mainar is a participle of a visigothic irregular verb "magan, main" which means "take heart on the battlefield."

Mainar was a member of the Community of Daroca Villages from 1248 until the dissolution of the same in 1833 with the formation of the current provincial division. So he shared the same historical events that shook the entire region.

He suffered the agitations of the Carlist wars strongly enough because the surrounding mountains were favorable for the guerrillas to hide.

He also suffered the turmoil of the Civil War (1936–1939).

Just a few years Mainar has become part of the new regional structure known as the Campo de Daroca. Its mayor is Esmeraldo Marzo, one of the former mayors of Aragon, old "dinosaur" of the policy, regime changes have not affected him so that he has been able to stay in power since 1979.

== Sites and Monuments ==
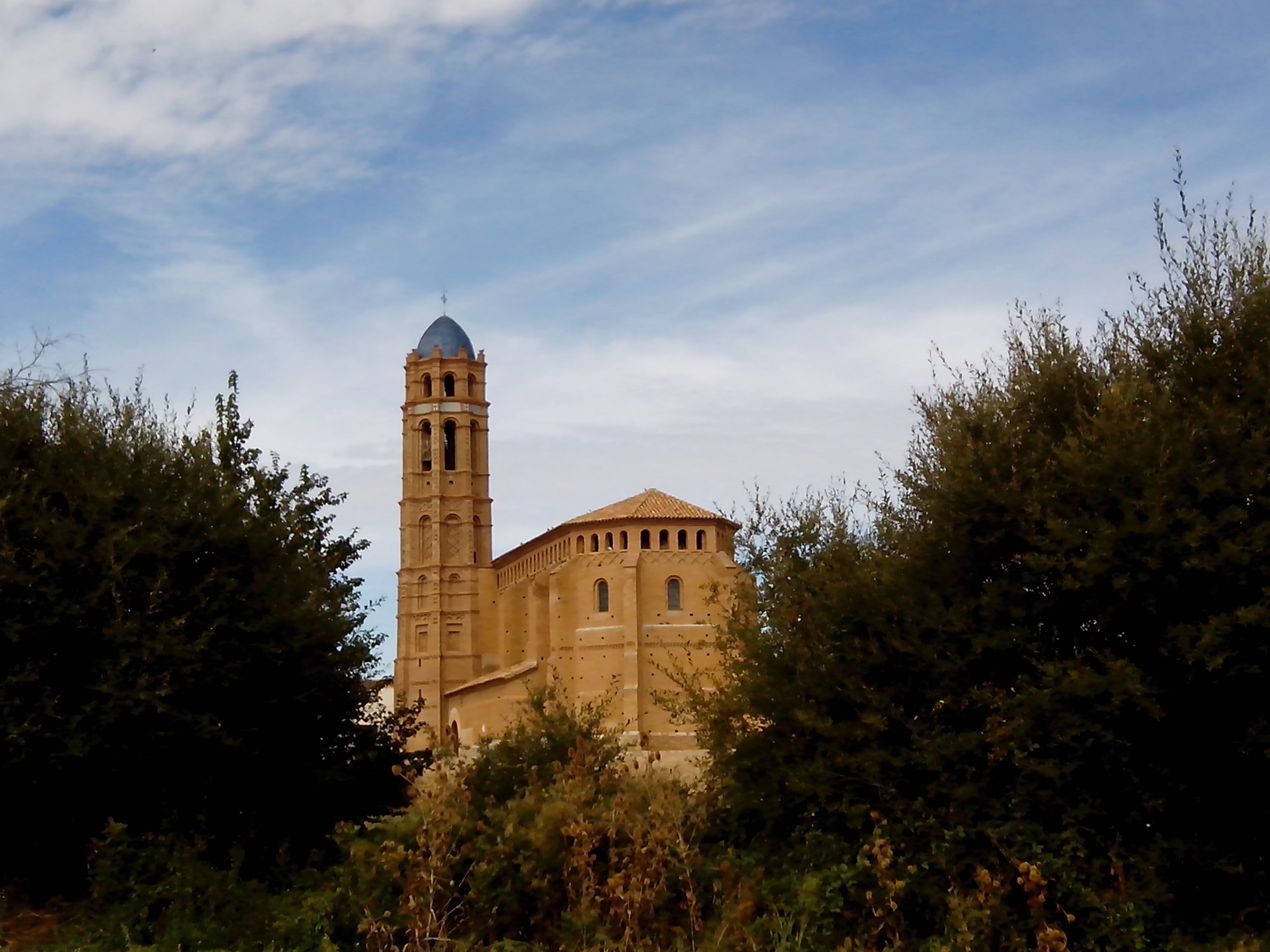
Santa Ana Church in Mainar, Zaragoza

The parish church of Santa Ana, built in the sixteenth century with one of the best Moorish towers of Aragon, built in the Moorish style and in its interior altarpieces of the seventeenth and eighteenth centuries are preserved, and the size of centuries XV and XVI . She was sacked by Erik the Belgian in the 1980s, some pieces were recovered later. The most valuable piece (A statue of San Blas originated between 1400 and 1450) does not deserve the attention of so famous looter.

There are also several stations of the cross ("peirones"), including the peirón San Antón (San Andrés sacred to the twentieth century) and peirón of the Virgin of Pilar ("peirón of Virgen del Pilar"); the hermitage of San Andrés (next peirón San Antón); Romanesque hermitage of Santo Domingo (actually ruins); and several Celtic ruins. There is also a Roman bridge, dated century Trajan (second century AD).

== People ==
Felix Monge, linguist.

Lamberto Funes, musician.

Joaquín Gómez "El Chato", musician.

== Politics ==
Esmeraldo Marzo Marín (UCD): 1979–1983

Esmeraldo Marzo Marín (PAR): 1983–1987

Esmeraldo Marzo Marín (PAR): 1987–1991

Esmeraldo Marzo Marín (PAR): 1991–1995

Esmeraldo Marzo Marín (PAR): 1995–1999

Esmeraldo Marzo Marín (PAR): 1999–2003

Esmeraldo Marzo Marín (PAR) 2003–2007

Esmeraldo Marzo Marín (PAR): 2007–2011

Esmeraldo Marzo Marín (PAR): 2011–2015

Esmeraldo Marzo Marín (PAR): 2015- Today

== See also ==
- List of municipalities in Zaragoza
