= Murero =

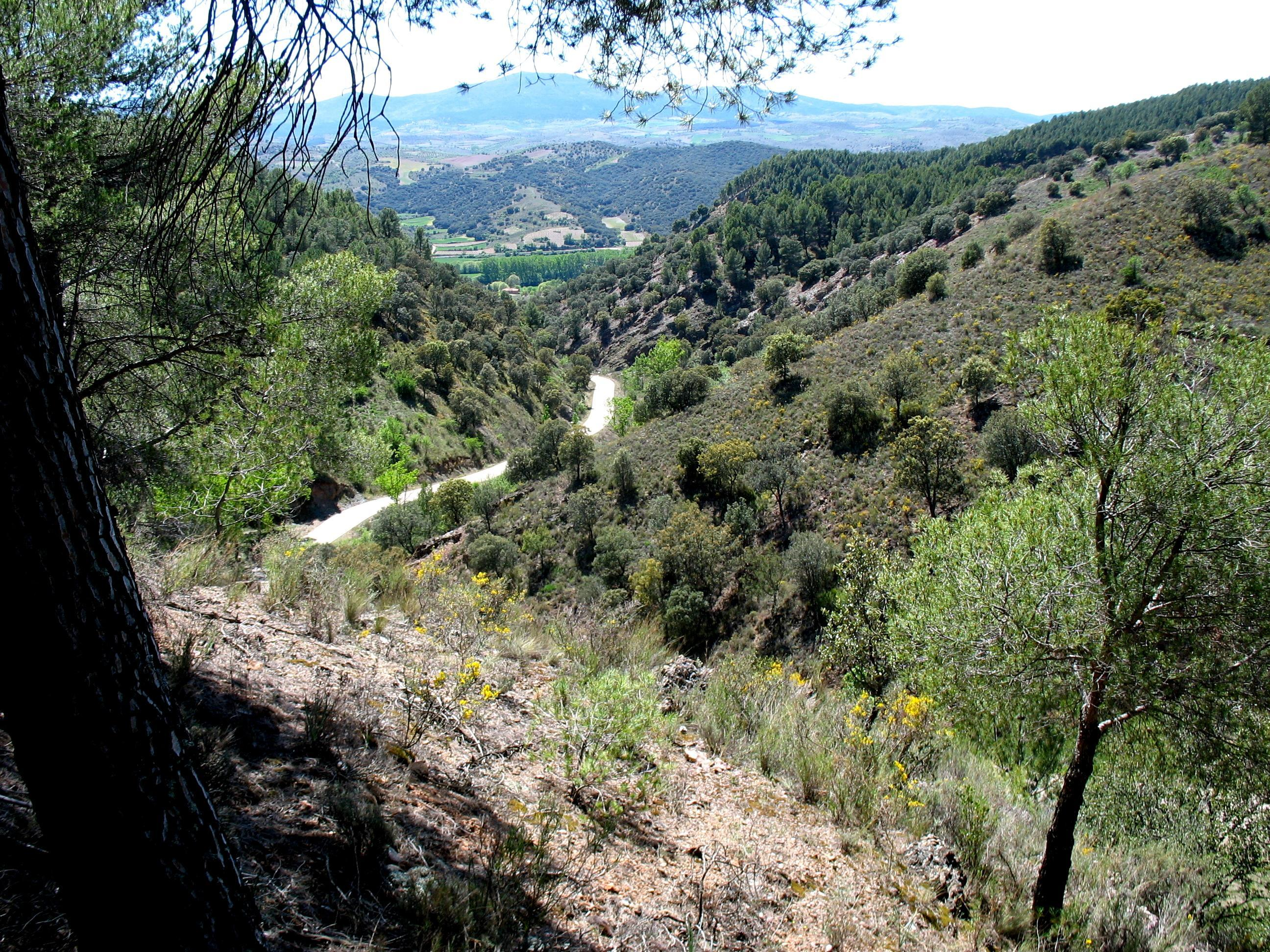

- Flag Coat of arms

- Location within Aragon Location within Spain Location within Europe
- Country: Spain
- Autonomous community: Aragon
- Province: Zaragoza
- Municipality: Murero

Population (2025-01-01)
  - Total: 85
- Time zone: UTC+1 (CET)
  - Summer (DST): UTC+2 (CEST)

Murero is a municipality in Zaragoza province.

== See also ==
- List of municipalities in Zaragoza
