= Joyosa =

Joyosa may refer to:

- La Joyosa, Zaragoza, Spain
- Villajoyosa (La Vila Joiosa), Alicante, Spain
- Gioiosa Ionica (Joyosa Ionica), Calabria, Italy
