= Villalba de Perejil =

Coordinates: 41°20′N 1°33′W

- municipality
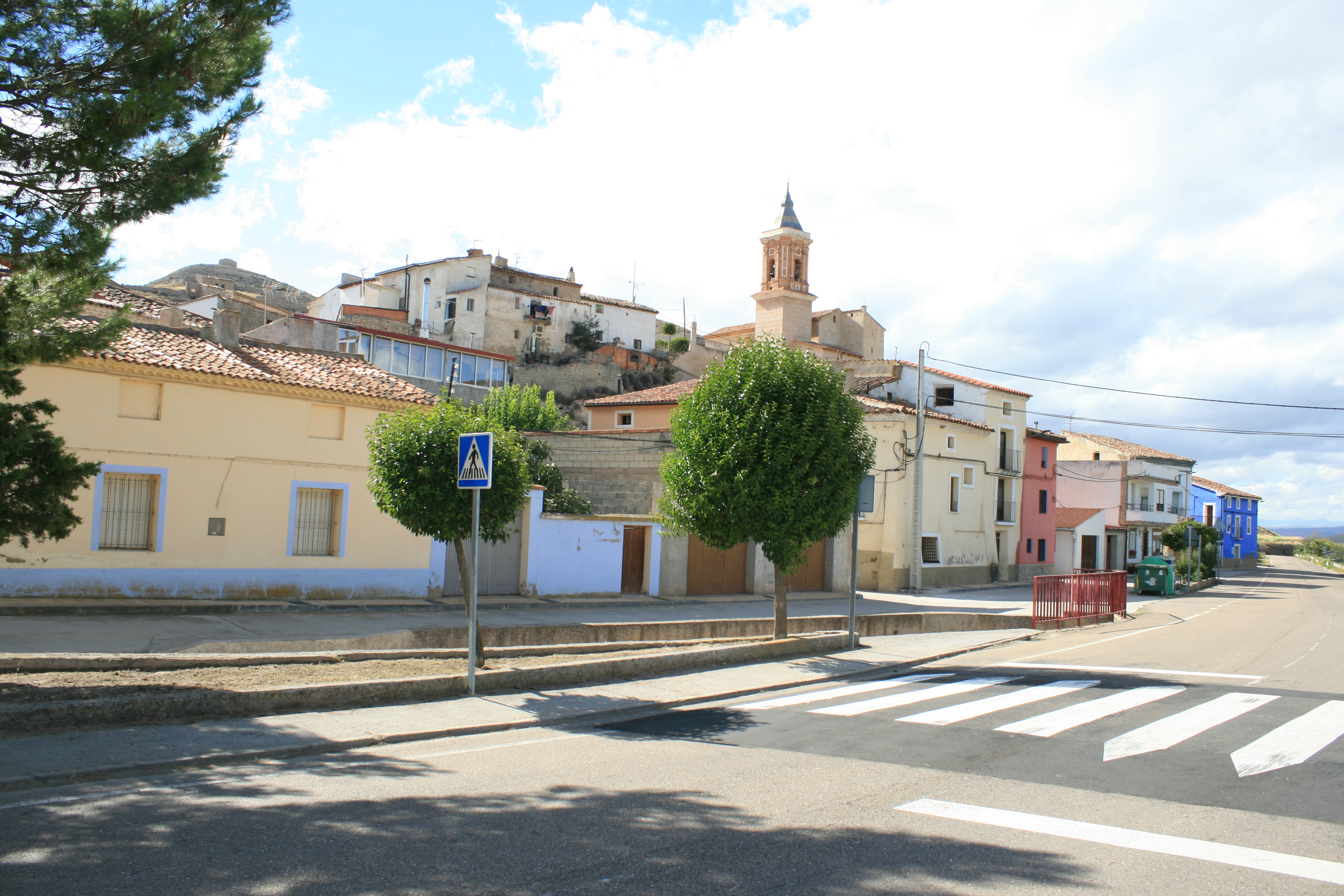
- View of Villalba de Perejil

- Flag Coat of arms
- Interactive map of Villalba de Perejil
- Country: Spain
- Autonomous community: Aragon
- Province: Zaragoza

Area
  - Total: 13 km^{2} (5.0 sq mi)

Population (2025-01-01)
  - Total: 86
  - Density: 6.6/km^{2} (17/sq mi)
- Time zone: UTC+1 (CET)
  - Summer (DST): UTC+2 (CEST)

Villalba de Perejil is a municipality located in the province of Zaragoza, Aragon, Spain. According to the 2004 census (INE), the municipality has a population of 123 inhabitants.

== See also ==
- List of municipalities in Zaragoza
