= Fombuena =

- municipality
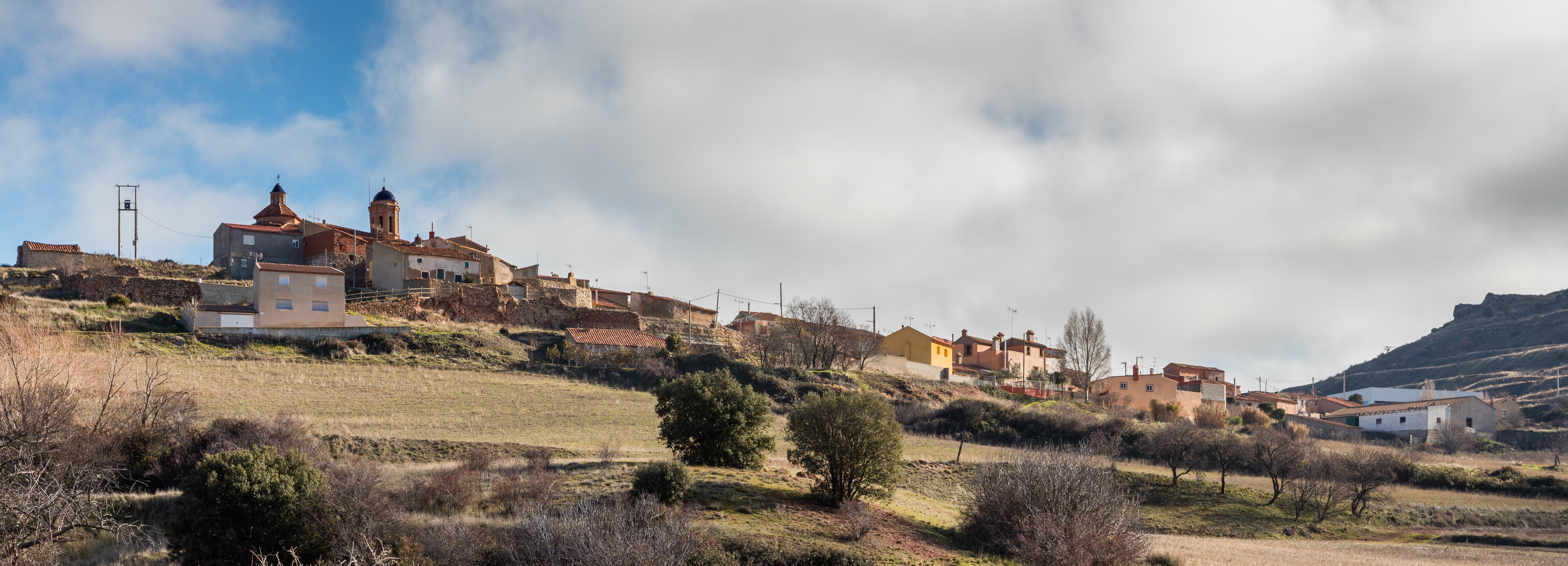

- Location within Aragon Location within Spain Location within Europe
- Country: Spain
- Autonomous community: Aragon
- Province: Zaragoza

Area
  - Total: 26 km^{2} (10 sq mi)

Population (2025-01-01)
  - Total: 59
  - Density: 2.3/km^{2} (5.9/sq mi)
- Time zone: UTC+1 (CET)
  - Summer (DST): UTC+2 (CEST)

Fombuena is a municipality located in the province of Zaragoza, Aragon, Spain. According to the 2004 census (INE), the municipality has a population of 14 inhabitants.

== See also ==
- List of municipalities in Zaragoza
