= Isuerre =

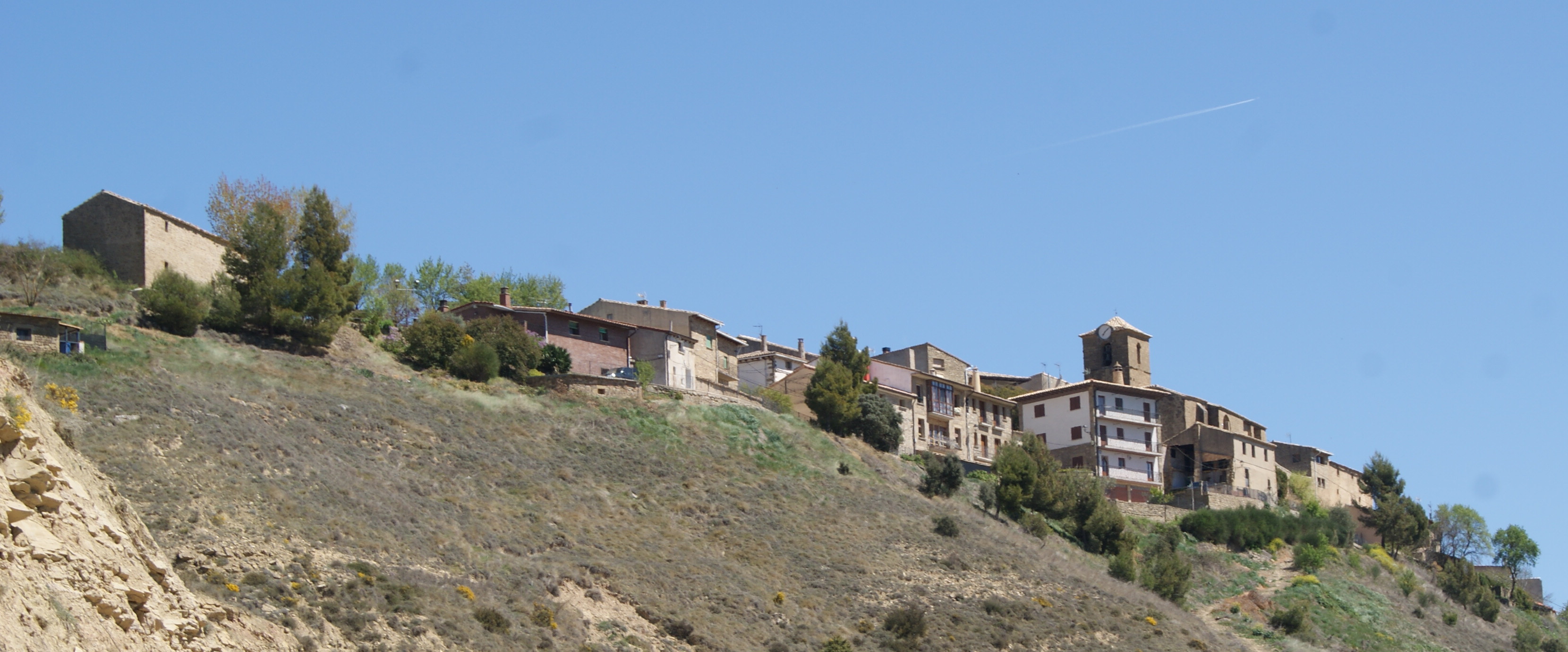

- Location within Aragon Location within Spain Location within Europe
- Country: Spain
- Autonomous community: Aragon
- Province: Zaragoza
- Municipality: Isuerre

Area
  - Total: 20 km^{2} (7.7 sq mi)

Population (2025-01-01)
  - Total: 32
  - Density: 1.6/km^{2} (4.1/sq mi)
- Time zone: UTC+1 (CET)
  - Summer (DST): UTC+2 (CEST)

Isuerre is a municipality located in the province of Zaragoza, in Aragon, Spain. According to the 2004 census (INE), the municipality has a population of 53 inhabitants.

== See also ==
- List of municipalities in Zaragoza
