= Cabolafuente =

- municipality
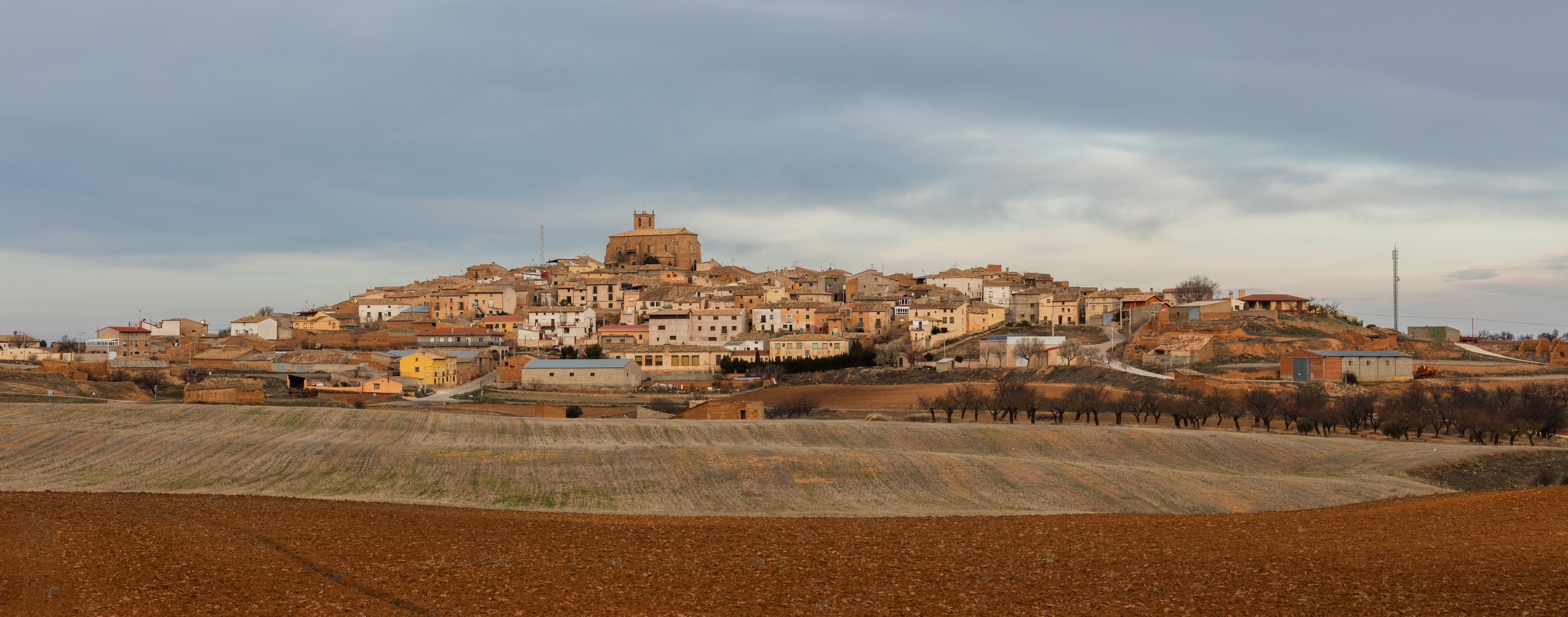

- Flag Coat of arms

- Location within Aragon Location within Spain Location within Europe
- Country: Spain
- Autonomous community: Aragon
- Province: Zaragoza
- Municipality: Cabolafuente

Area
  - Total: 39.00 km^{2} (15.06 sq mi)
- Elevation: 977 m (3,205 ft)

Population (2025-01-01)
  - Total: 50
  - Density: 1.3/km^{2} (3.3/sq mi)
- Time zone: UTC+1 (CET)
  - Summer (DST): UTC+2 (CEST)

Cabolafuente is a municipality located in the province of Zaragoza, Aragon, Spain. According to the 2004 census (INE), the municipality has a population of 67 inhabitants.

== See also ==
- List of municipalities in Zaragoza
