= El Frago =

El Frago (Spanish) O Frago (Aragonese)
- municipality
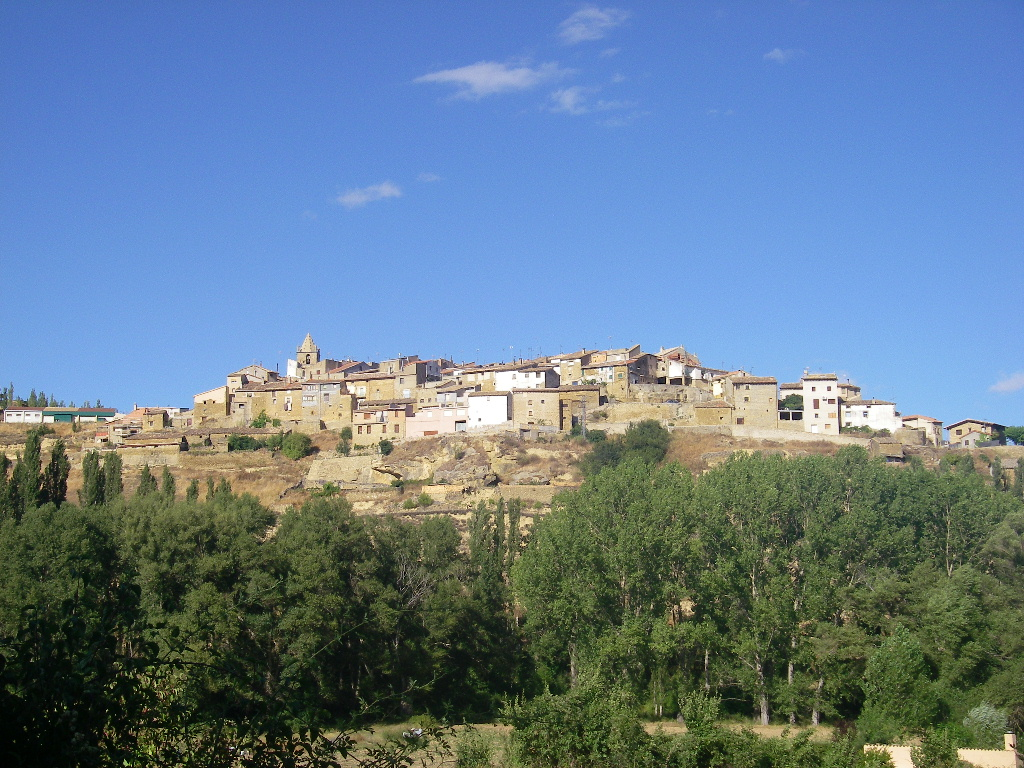

- Flag Coat of arms

- Location within Aragon Location within Spain Location within Europe
- Coordinates: 42°16′N 0°56′W
- Country: Spain
- Autonomous community: Aragon
- Province: Zaragoza

Area
  - Total: 33 km^{2} (13 sq mi)

Population (2025-01-01)
  - Total: 129
  - Density: 3.9/km^{2} (10/sq mi)
- Time zone: UTC+1 (CET)
  - Summer (DST): UTC+2 (CEST)

El Frago (Aragonese: O Frago) is a municipality located in the province of Zaragoza, Aragon, Spain. According to the 2004 census (INE), the municipality has a population of 119 inhabitants.

== See also ==
- List of municipalities in Zaragoza
