= Montón =

- Flag Coat of arms

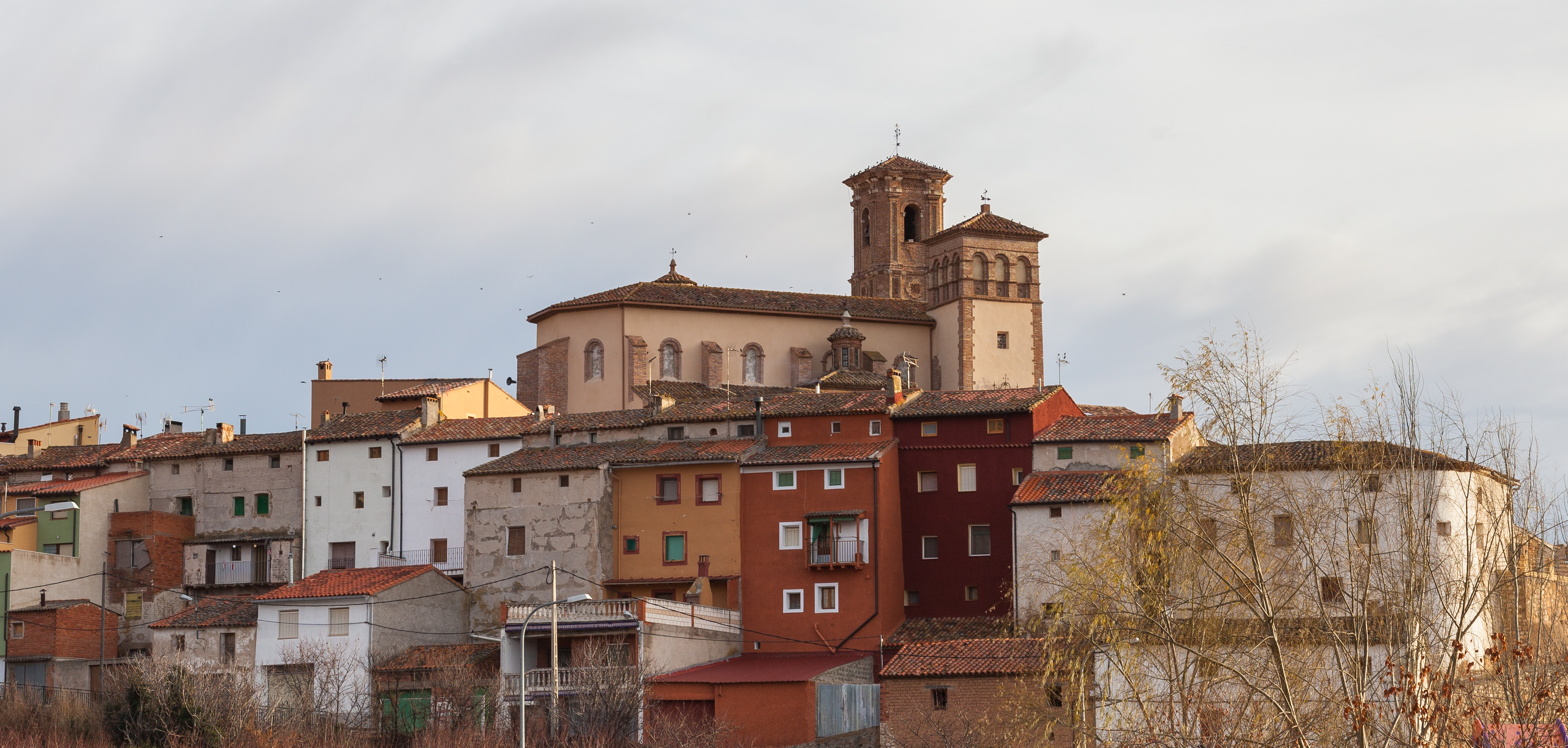
- Coordinates: 41.2066°N 1.5156°W
- Country: Spain
- Autonomous community: Aragon
- Province: Zaragoza
- Municipality: Montón

Area
  - Total: 17 km^{2} (6.6 sq mi)

Population (2025-01-01)
  - Total: 89
  - Density: 5.2/km^{2} (14/sq mi)
- Time zone: UTC+1 (CET)
  - Summer (DST): UTC+2 (CEST)

Montón is a municipality located in the province of Zaragoza, Aragon, Spain. According to the 2004 census (INE), the municipality has a population of 144 inhabitants.

== See also ==
- List of municipalities in Zaragoza
