= Chiprana =

- municipality
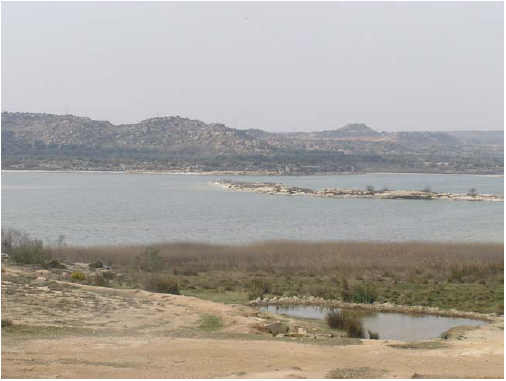

- Flag Coat of arms

- Location within Aragon Location within Spain Location within Europe
- Country: Spain
- Autonomous community: Aragon
- Province: Zaragoza

Area
  - Total: 38 km^{2} (15 sq mi)

Population (2025-01-01)
  - Total: 496
  - Density: 13/km^{2} (34/sq mi)
- Time zone: UTC+1 (CET)
  - Summer (DST): UTC+2 (CEST)

Chiprana (Spanish pronunciation: [tʃiˈpɾana]) is a municipality located in the province of Zaragoza, Aragon, Spain. According to the 2004 census (INE), the municipality has a population of 368 inhabitants. Its climate ranges over the course of the year, from 3°C to 34°C.

== See also ==
- List of municipalities in Zaragoza
