= Pleitas =

Coordinates: 41°43′N 1°13′W

- municipality
- Flag Coat of arms
- Interactive map of Pleitas
- Country: Spain
- Autonomous community: Aragon
- Province: Zaragoza

Area
  - Total: 2 km^{2} (0.77 sq mi)

Population (2025-01-01)
  - Total: 29
  - Density: 14/km^{2} (38/sq mi)
- Time zone: UTC+1 (CET)
  - Summer (DST): UTC+2 (CEST)

Pleitas is a municipality located in the province of Zaragoza, Aragon, Spain. According to the 2004 census (INE), the municipality has a population of 62 inhabitants.

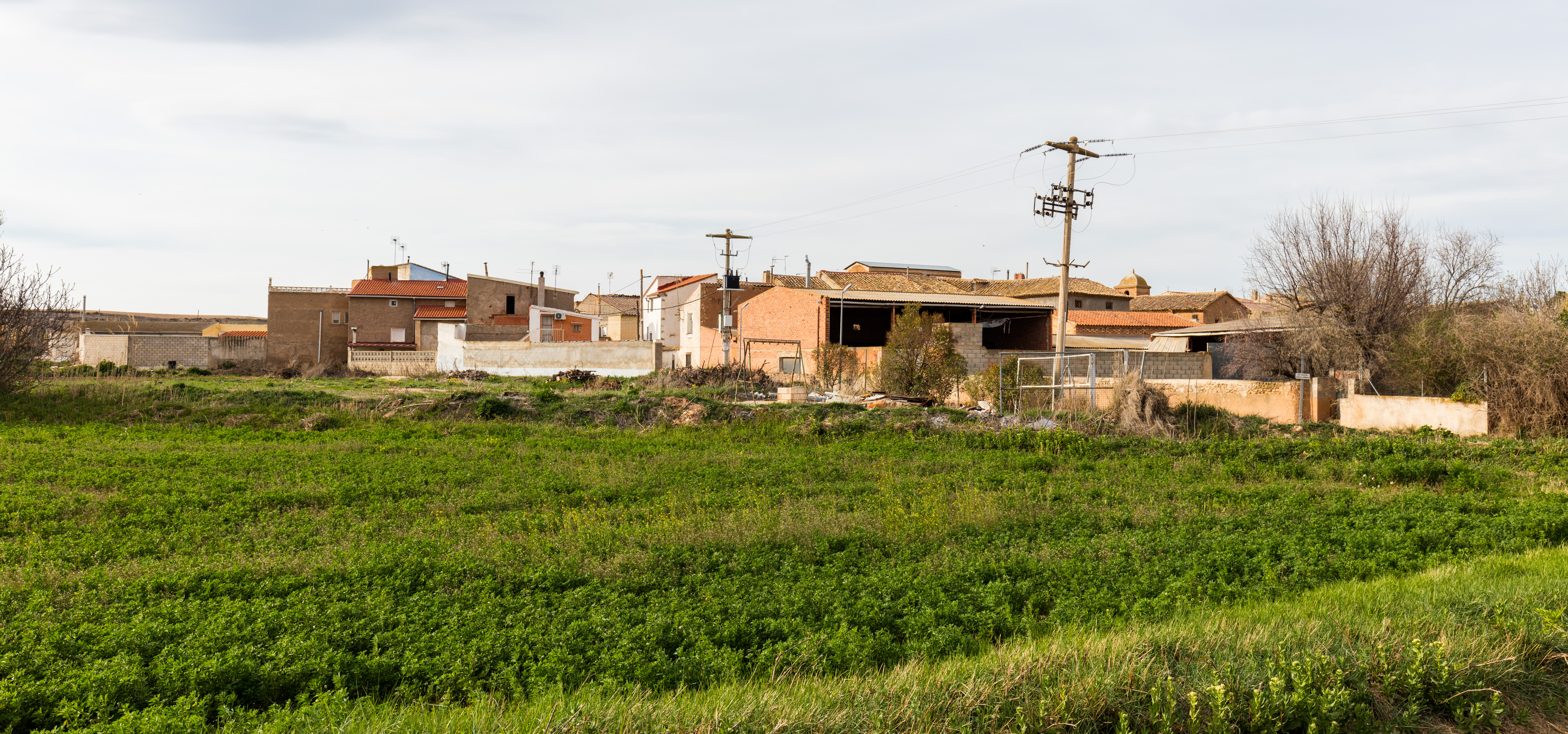
View of Pleitas, Zaragoza, Spain

== See also ==
- List of municipalities in Zaragoza
