= Ruesca =

Coordinates: 41°17′N 1°29′W

- municipality
- Flag Coat of arms
- Interactive map of Ruesca
- Country: Spain
- Autonomous community: Aragon
- Province: Zaragoza
- Municipality: Ruesca

Area
  - Total: 11 km^{2} (4.2 sq mi)

Population (2025-01-01)
  - Total: 69
  - Density: 6.3/km^{2} (16/sq mi)
- Time zone: UTC+1 (CET)
  - Summer (DST): UTC+2 (CEST)

Ruesca is a municipality located in the province of Zaragoza, Aragon, Spain. According to the 2004 census (INE), the municipality has a population of 86 inhabitants.

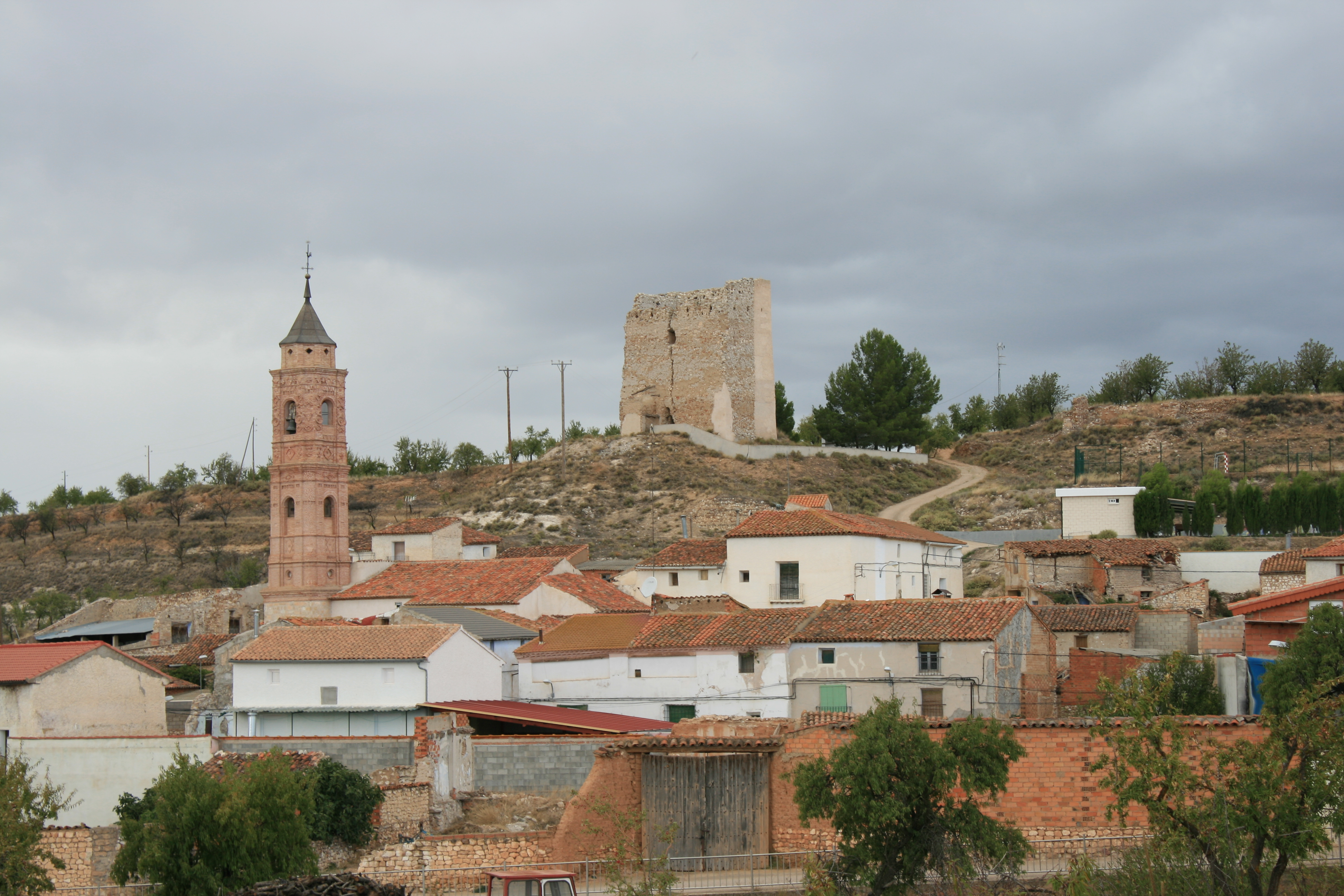
View of Ruesca, Zaragoza, Spain

== See also ==
- List of municipalities in Zaragoza
