= Orera =

Coordinates: 41°18′N 1°28′W

- municipality
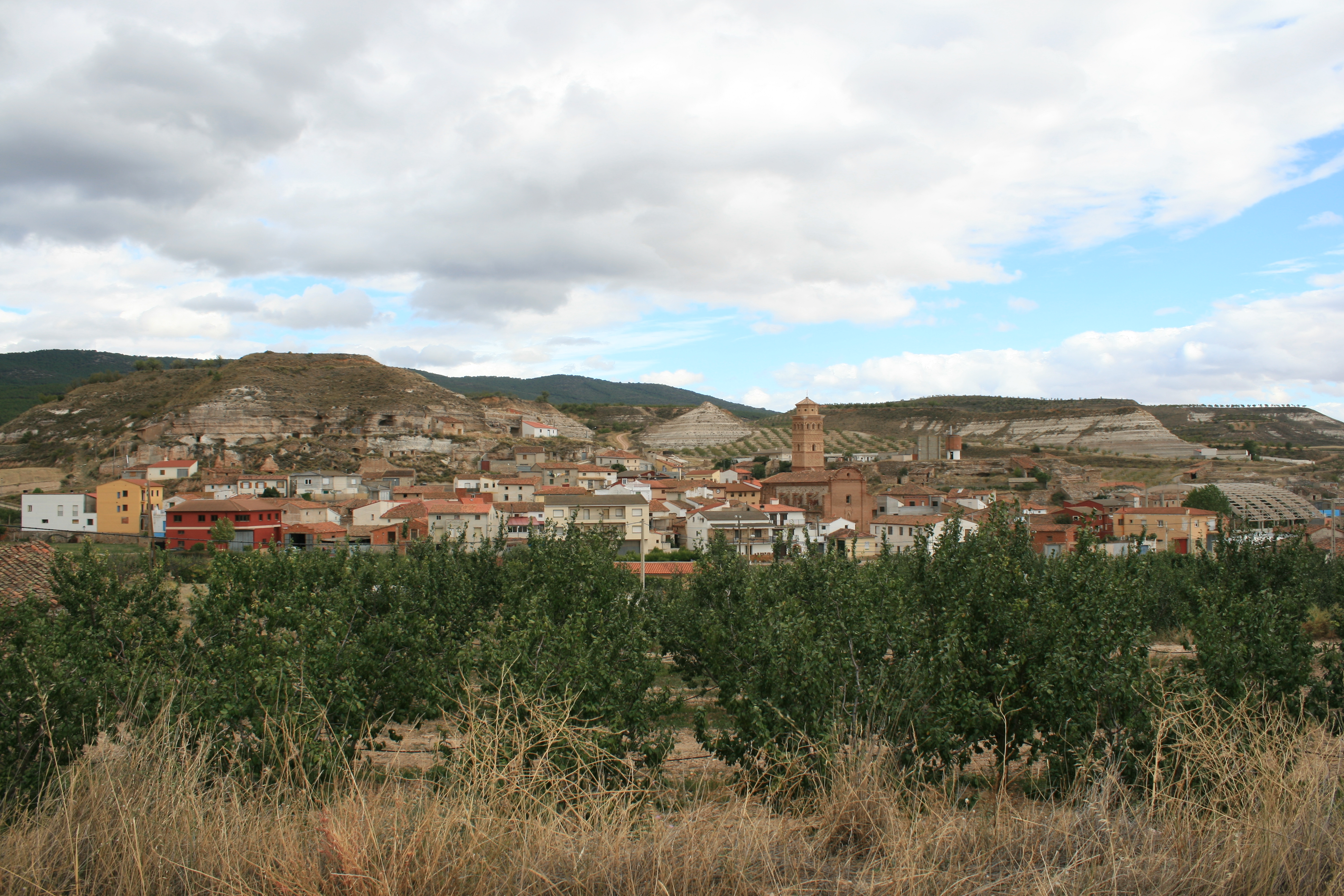
- View of Orera, Zaragoza, Spain

- Flag Coat of arms
- Interactive map of Orera
- Country: Spain
- Autonomous community: Aragon
- Province: Zaragoza
- Municipality: Orera

Area
  - Total: 19 km^{2} (7.3 sq mi)

Population (2025-01-01)
  - Total: 103
  - Density: 5.4/km^{2} (14/sq mi)
- Time zone: UTC+1 (CET)
  - Summer (DST): UTC+2 (CEST)

Orera is a municipality located in the province of Zaragoza, Aragon, Spain. According to the 2004 census (INE), the municipality has a population of 131 inhabitants.

== See also ==
- List of municipalities in Zaragoza
