= Miedes de Aragón =

Miedes de Aragón, Spain
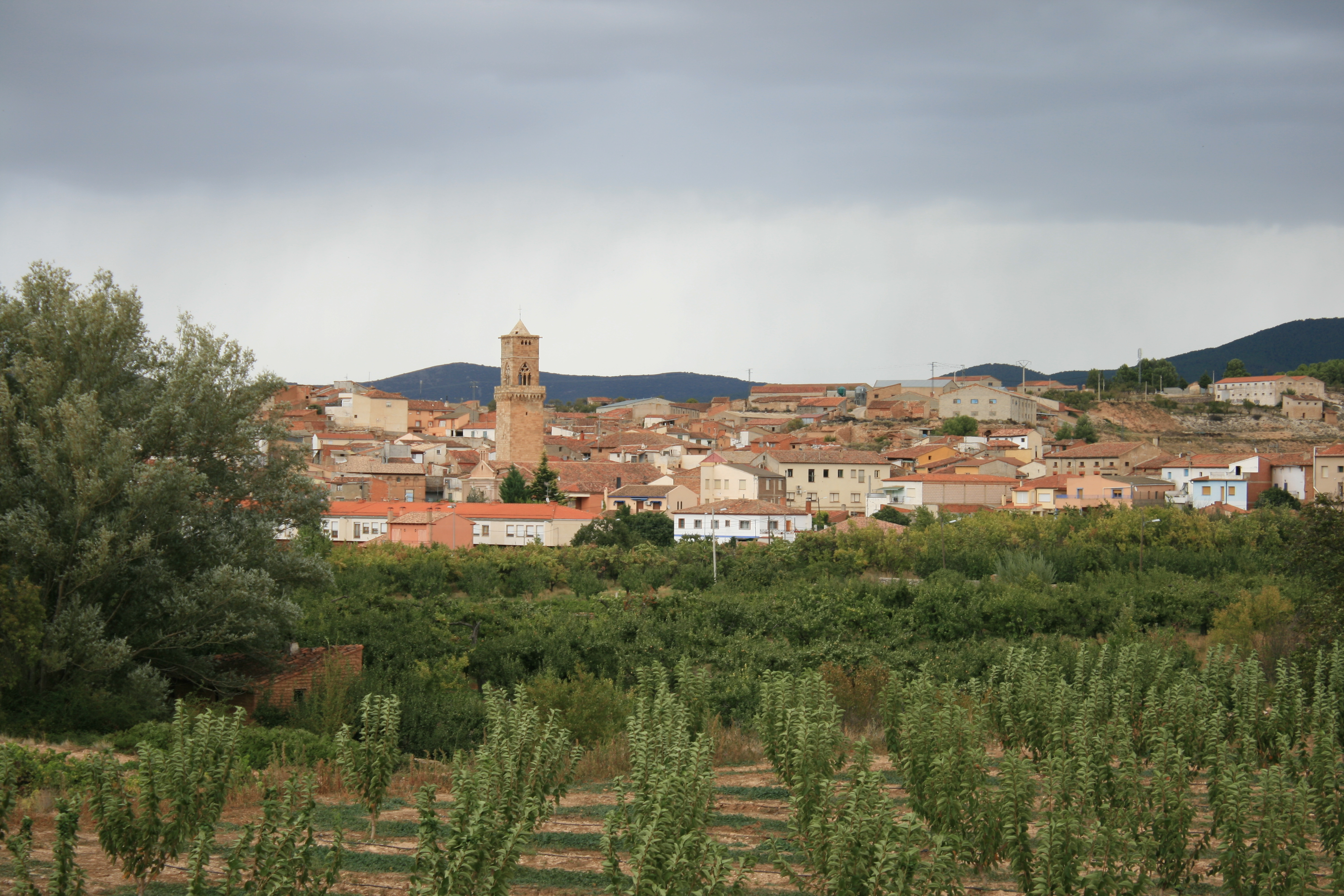
- View of Miedes, Zaragoza, Spain

- Flag Coat of arms
- Interactive map of Miedes de Aragón, Spain
- Coordinates: 41.2500°N 1.4833°W
- Country: Spain
- Autonomous community: Aragon
- Province: Zaragoza
- Municipality: Miedes de Aragón

Area
  - Total: 55 km^{2} (21 sq mi)

Population (2025-01-01)
  - Total: 408
  - Density: 7.4/km^{2} (19/sq mi)
- Time zone: UTC+1 (CET)
  - Summer (DST): UTC+2 (CEST)

Miedes de Aragón is a municipality located in the province of Zaragoza, Aragon, Spain. According to the 2004 census (INE), the municipality has a population of 496 inhabitants.

== See also ==
- List of municipalities in Zaragoza
