= Luesma =

Coordinates: 41°10′N 1°09′W

- municipality
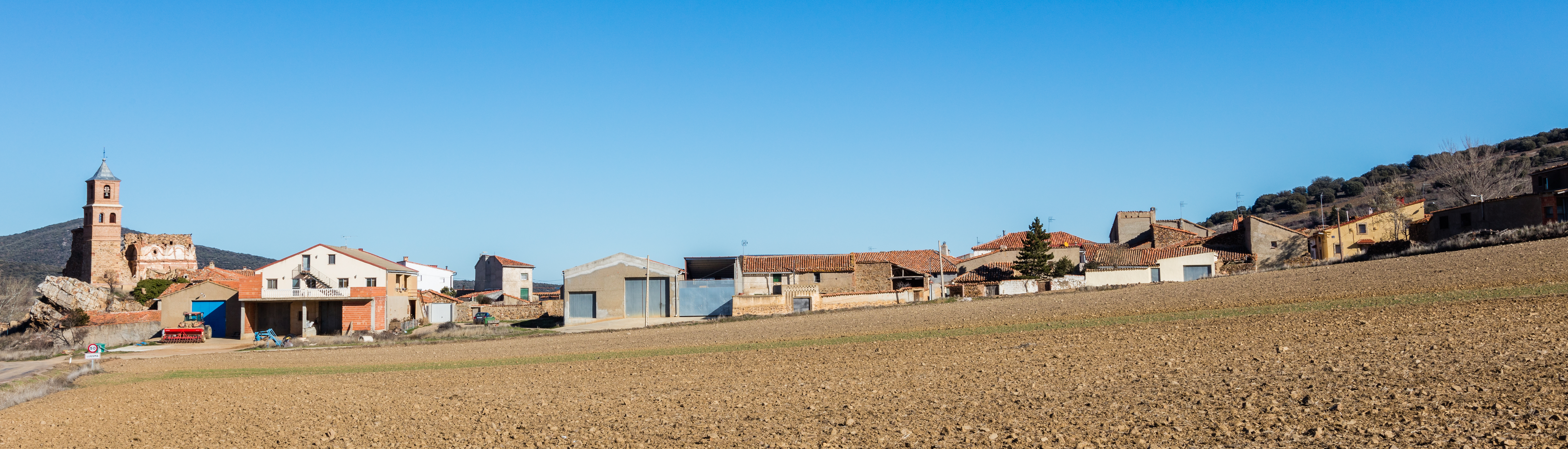
- Panoramic view of Luesma

- Flag Coat of arms
- Interactive map of Luesma
- Country: Spain
- Autonomous community: Aragon
- Province: Zaragoza

Area
  - Total: 29 km^{2} (11 sq mi)

Population (2025-01-01)
  - Total: 42
  - Density: 1.4/km^{2} (3.8/sq mi)
- Time zone: UTC+1 (CET)
  - Summer (DST): UTC+2 (CEST)

Luesma is a municipality located in the province of Zaragoza, Aragon, Spain. According to the 2004 census (INE), the municipality has a population of 40 inhabitants.

== See also ==
- List of municipalities in Zaragoza
