= Sisamón =

Coordinates: 41°10′N 2°00′W

Sisamón, Spain
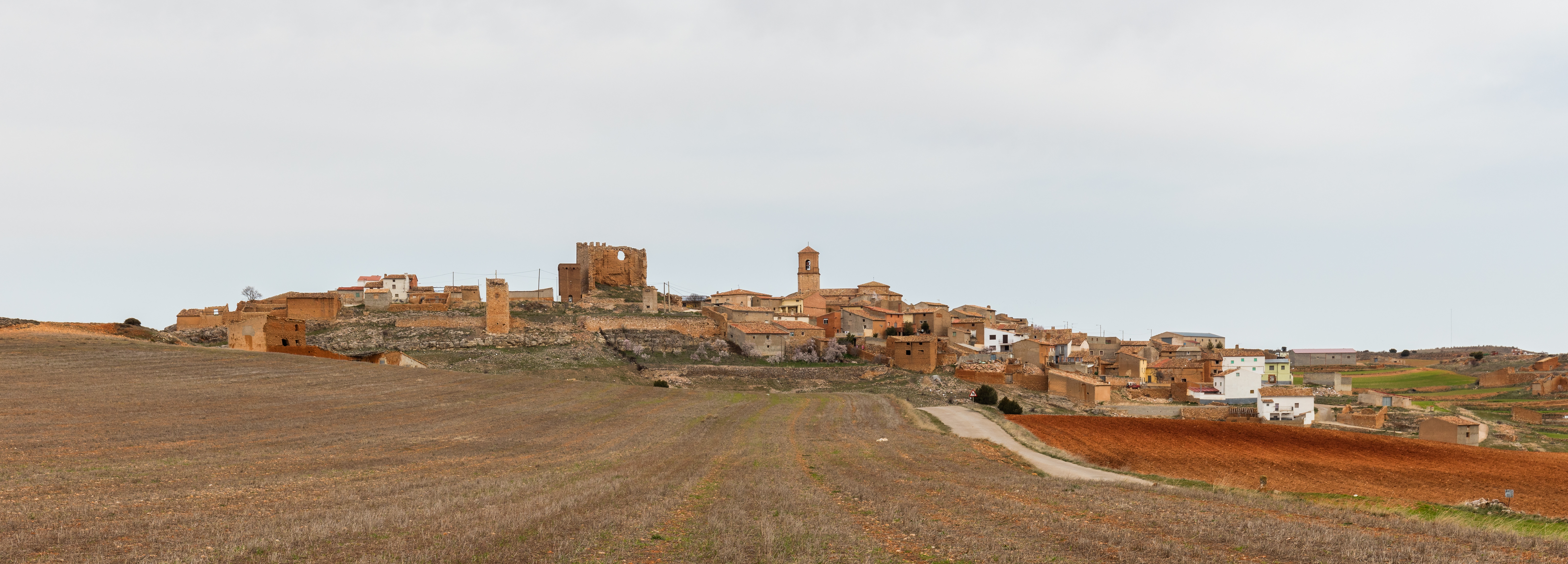
- View of Sisamón, Zaragoza, Spain

- Coat of arms
- Interactive map of Sisamón, Spain
- Country: Spain
- Autonomous community: Aragon
- Province: Zaragoza
- Municipality: Sisamón

Area
  - Total: 41 km^{2} (16 sq mi)
- Elevation: 1,051 m (3,448 ft)

Population (2025-01-01)
  - Total: 50
  - Density: 1.2/km^{2} (3.2/sq mi)
- Time zone: UTC+1 (CET)
  - Summer (DST): UTC+2 (CEST)

Sisamón is a municipality located in the province of Zaragoza, Aragon, Spain. According to the 2004 census (INE), the municipality has a population of 60 inhabitants.

== See also ==
- List of municipalities in Zaragoza
