= Aniñón =

Aniñón, Spain
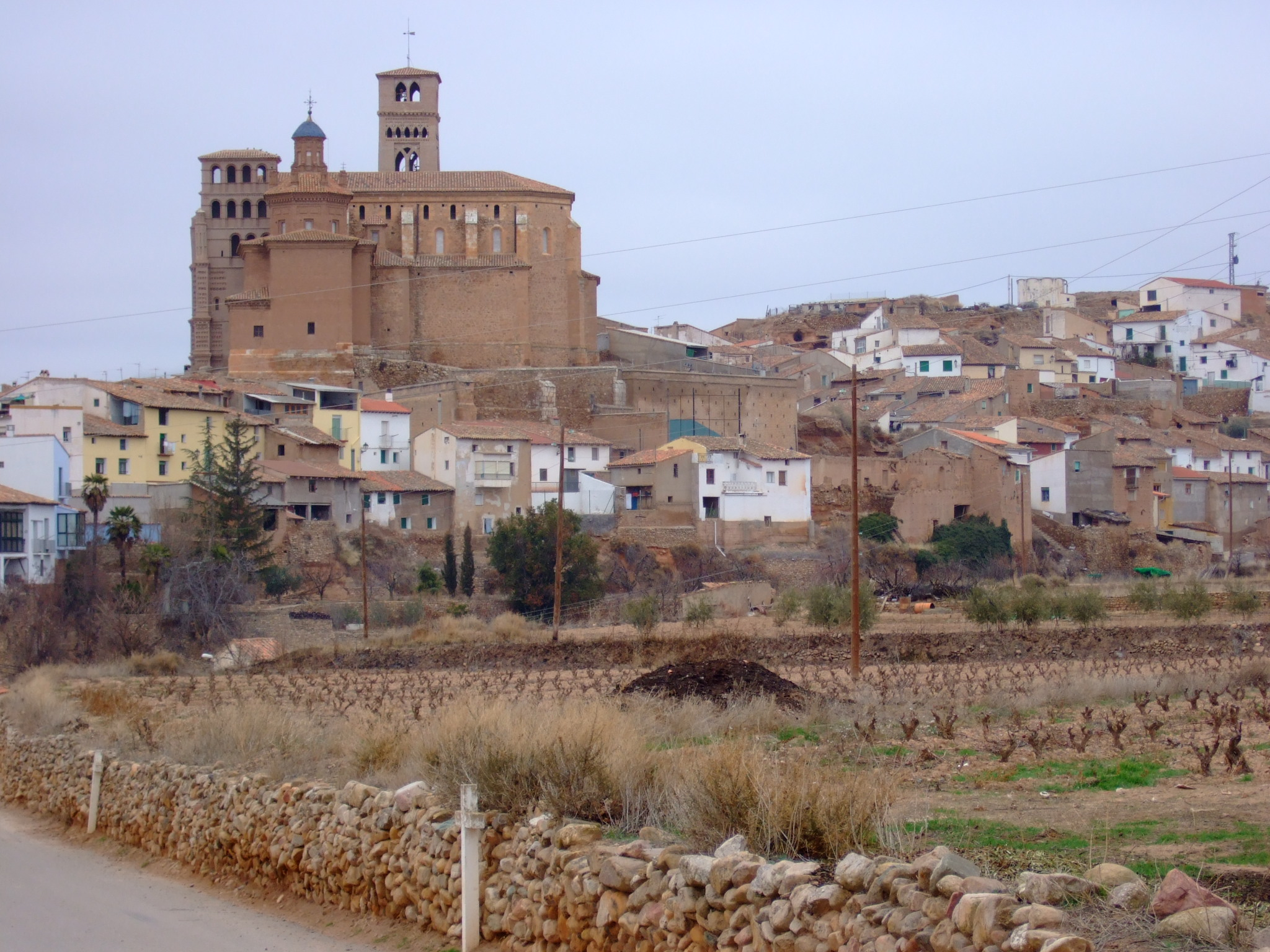

- Flag Coat of arms

- Location in Spain Aniñón, Spain (Spain) Aniñón, Spain (Europe)
- Coordinates: 41.43333°N 1.7000°W
- Country: Spain
- Autonomous community: Aragon
- Province: Zaragoza
- Municipality: Aniñón

Area
  - Total: 52 km^{2} (20 sq mi)

Population (2025-01-01)
  - Total: 678
  - Density: 13/km^{2} (34/sq mi)
- Time zone: UTC+1 (CET)
  - Summer (DST): UTC+2 (CEST)

Aniñón is a municipality located in the province of Zaragoza, Aragon, Spain. According to the 2004 census (INE), the municipality has a population of 837 inhabitants.

== See also ==
- List of municipalities in Zaragoza
