= Urrea de Jalón =

Urrea de Jalón, Spain
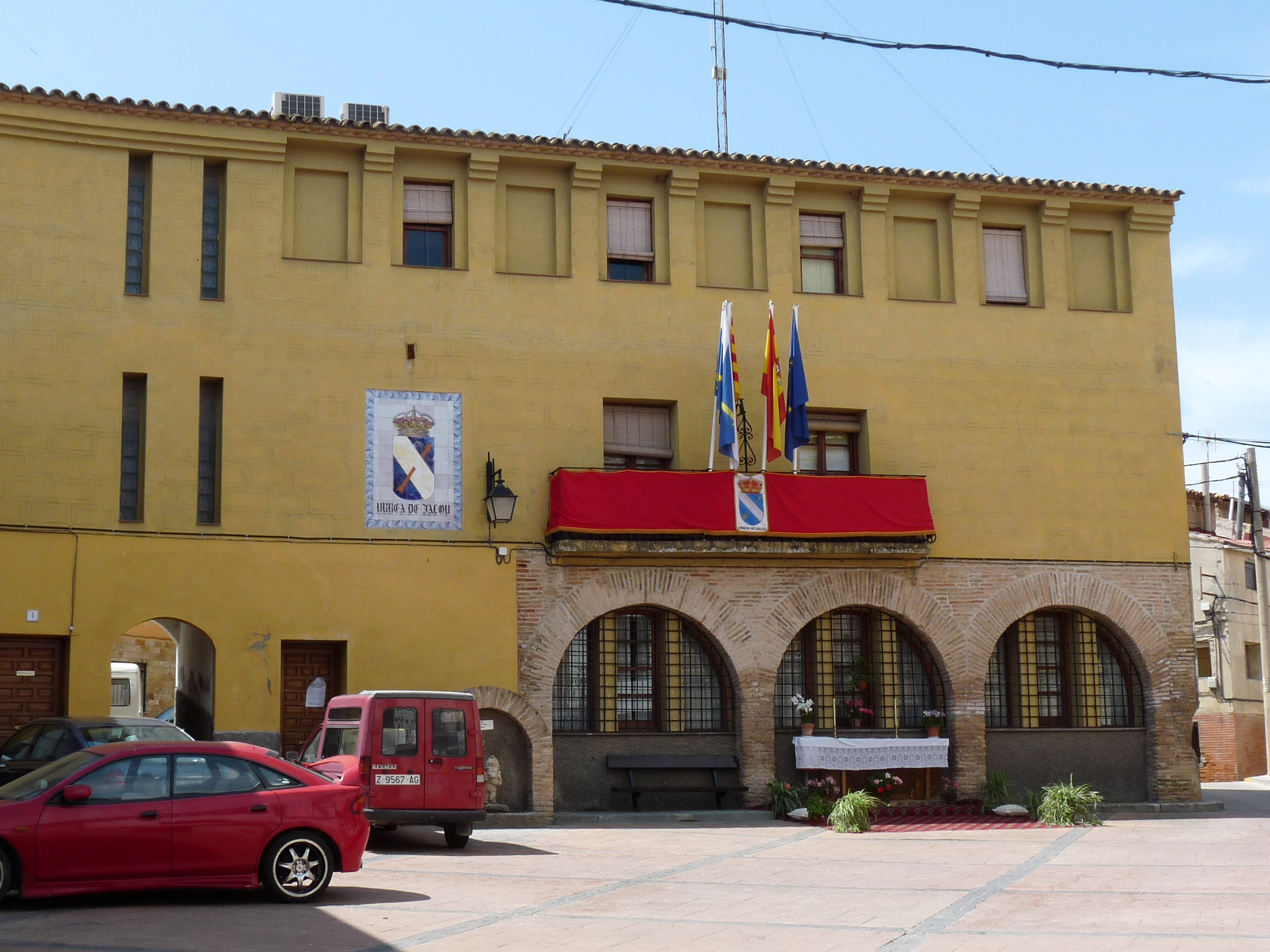
- Town hall

- Flag Coat of arms
- Interactive map of Urrea de Jalón, Spain
- Coordinates: 41°40′N 1°14′W
- Country: Spain
- Autonomous community: Aragon
- Province: Zaragoza
- Municipality: Urrea de Jalón

Area
  - Total: 25 km^{2} (9.7 sq mi)

Population (2009)
  - Total: 423
  - Density: 17/km^{2} (44/sq mi)
- Time zone: UTC+1 (CET)
  - Summer (DST): UTC+2 (CEST)

Urrea de Jalón is a municipality located in the province of Zaragoza, Aragon, Spain. According to the 2004 census (INE), the municipality has a population of 344 inhabitants.

== See also ==
- List of municipalities in Zaragoza
