= Oseja =

Coordinates: 41°36′N 1°42′W

- municipality
- Interactive map of Oseja
- Country: Spain
- Autonomous community: Aragon
- Province: Zaragoza

Area
  - Total: 12 km^{2} (4.6 sq mi)

Population (2025-01-01)
  - Total: 43
  - Density: 3.6/km^{2} (9.3/sq mi)
- Time zone: UTC+1 (CET)
  - Summer (DST): UTC+2 (CEST)

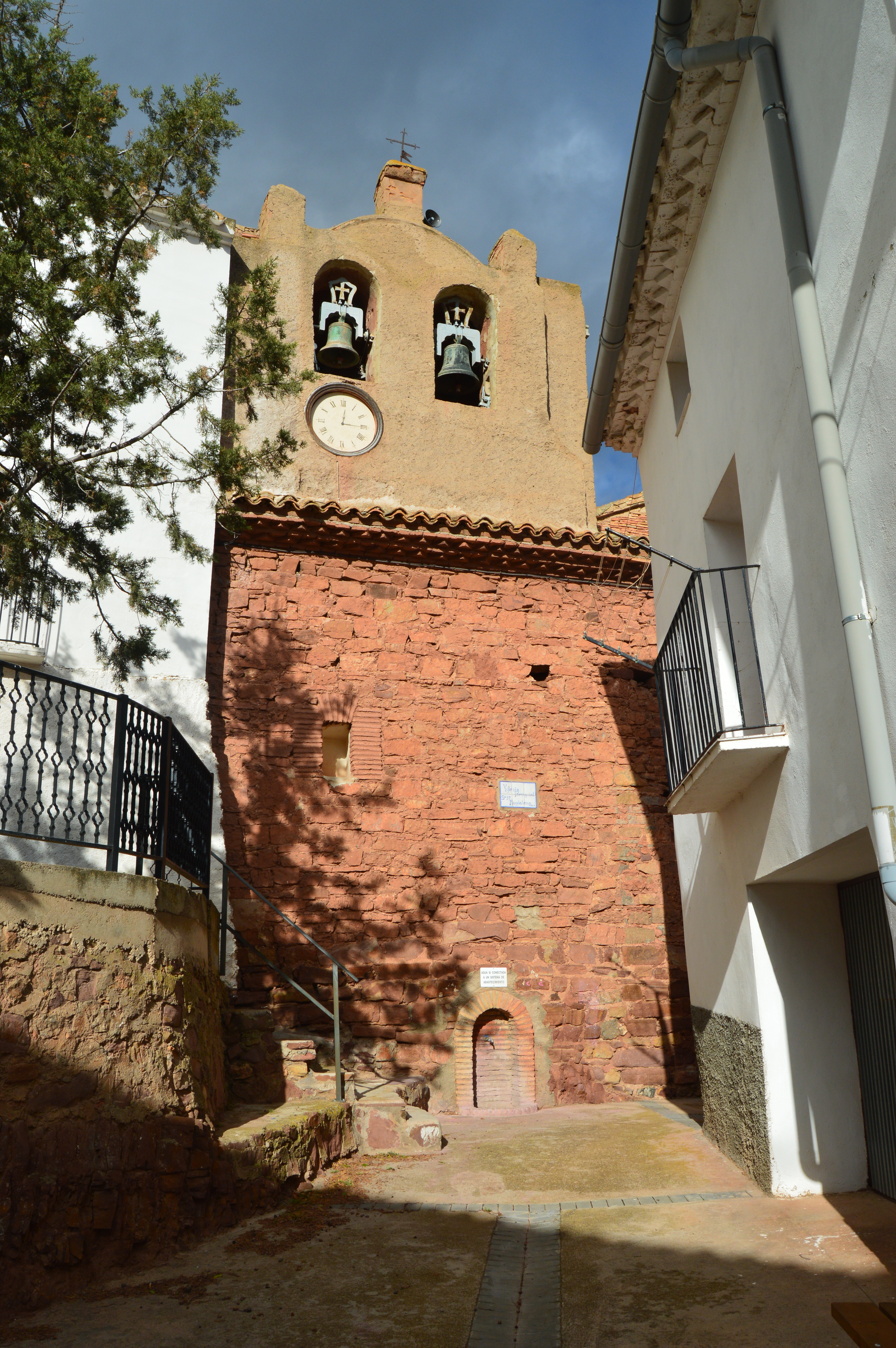
Parish Church of Santa María Magdalena de Oseja, Zaragoza.

Oseja is a municipality located in the province of Zaragoza, Aragon, Spain. According to the 2004 census (INE), the municipality has a population of 52 inhabitants.

== See also ==
- List of municipalities in Zaragoza
