= Pomer, Zaragoza =

Coordinates: 41°38′N 1°50′W

Pomer
- municipality
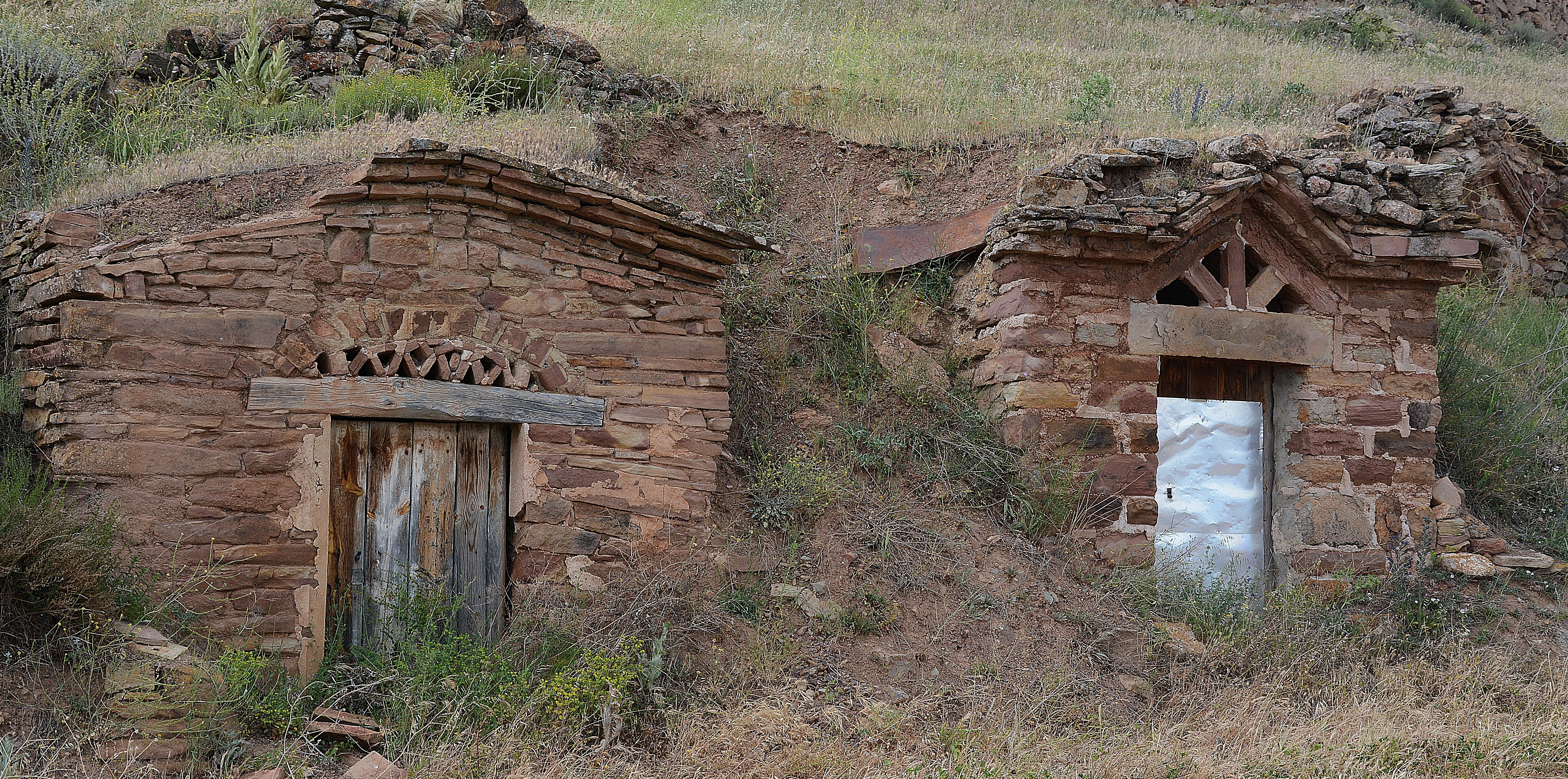
- Ancient cellars in pomer, the buildings of special interest
- Interactive map of Pomer
- Country: Spain
- Autonomous community: Aragon
- Province: Zaragoza

Area
  - Total: 33 km^{2} (13 sq mi)

Population (2025-01-01)
  - Total: 23
  - Density: 0.70/km^{2} (1.8/sq mi)
- Time zone: UTC+1 (CET)
  - Summer (DST): UTC+2 (CEST)

Pomer is a municipality located in the province of Zaragoza, Aragon, Spain. At the 2004 census (INE), the municipality had a population of 35 inhabitants.

The majority of people devote their time to keep the livestock and agriculture of the place. Also is common hunting Pomer has not official web page but its reference in internet is Pomer.org.

== See also ==
- List of municipalities in Zaragoza
