= Valpalmas =

Coordinates: 42°09′N 0°51′W

- municipality
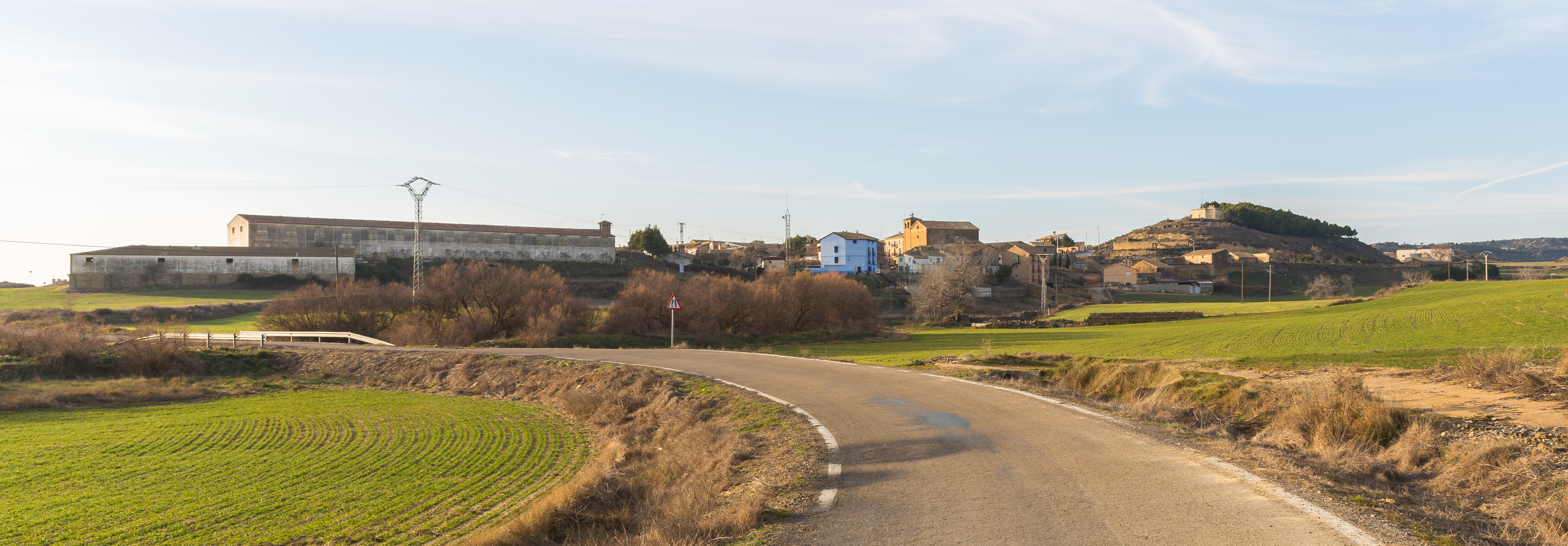

- Flag Coat of arms
- Interactive map of Valpalmas
- Country: Spain
- Autonomous community: Aragon
- Province: Zaragoza

Area
  - Total: 39.6 km^{2} (15.3 sq mi)
- Elevation: 493 m (1,617 ft)

Population (2025-01-01)
  - Total: 122
  - Density: 3.08/km^{2} (7.98/sq mi)
- Time zone: UTC+1 (CET)
  - Summer (DST): UTC+2 (CEST)

Valpalmas is a municipality located in the province of Zaragoza, Aragon, Spain. According to the 2004 census (INE), the municipality has a population of 168 inhabitants.

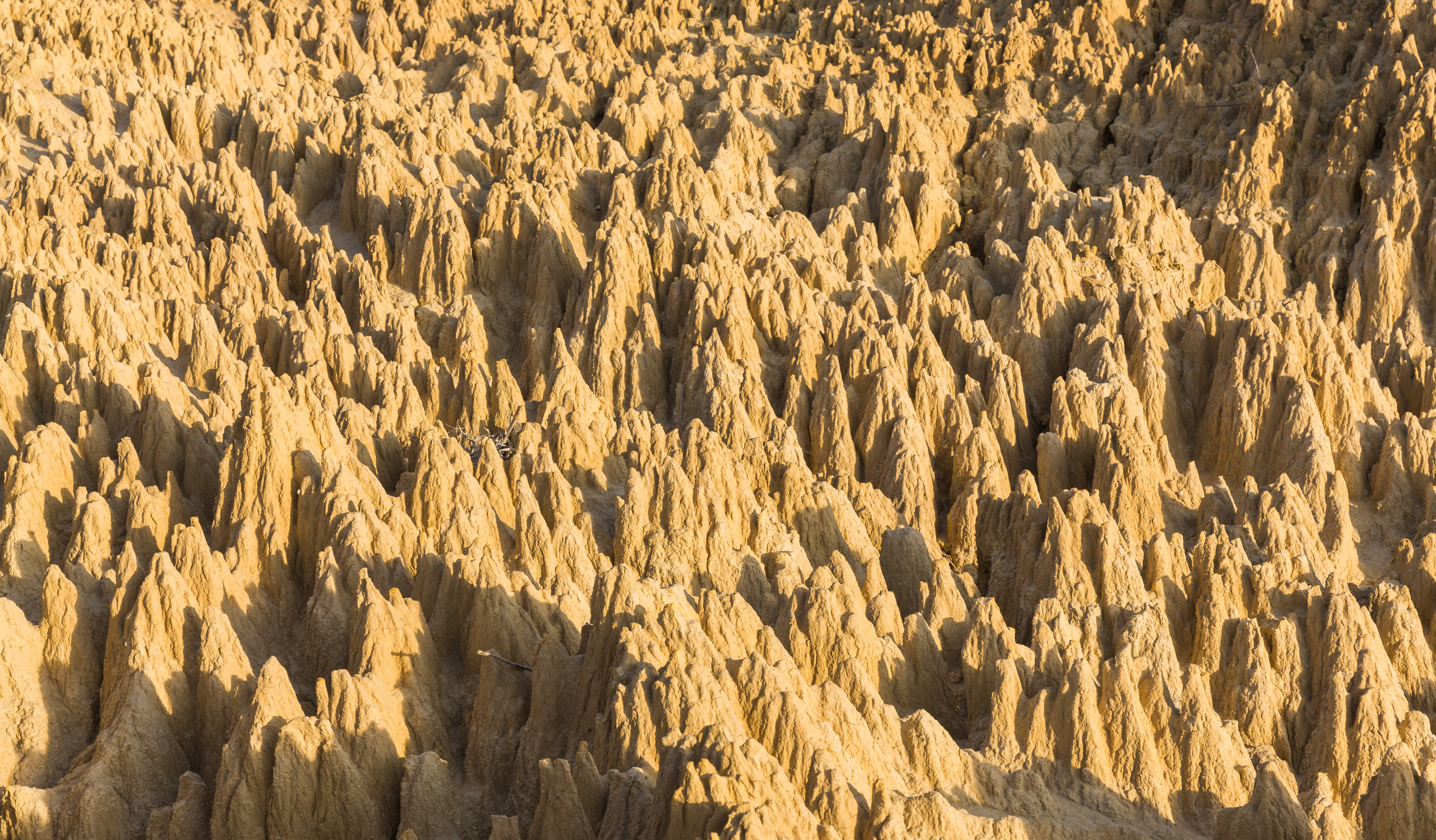
Aguarales de Valpalmas.

== See also ==
- List of municipalities in Zaragoza
