= Bijuesca =

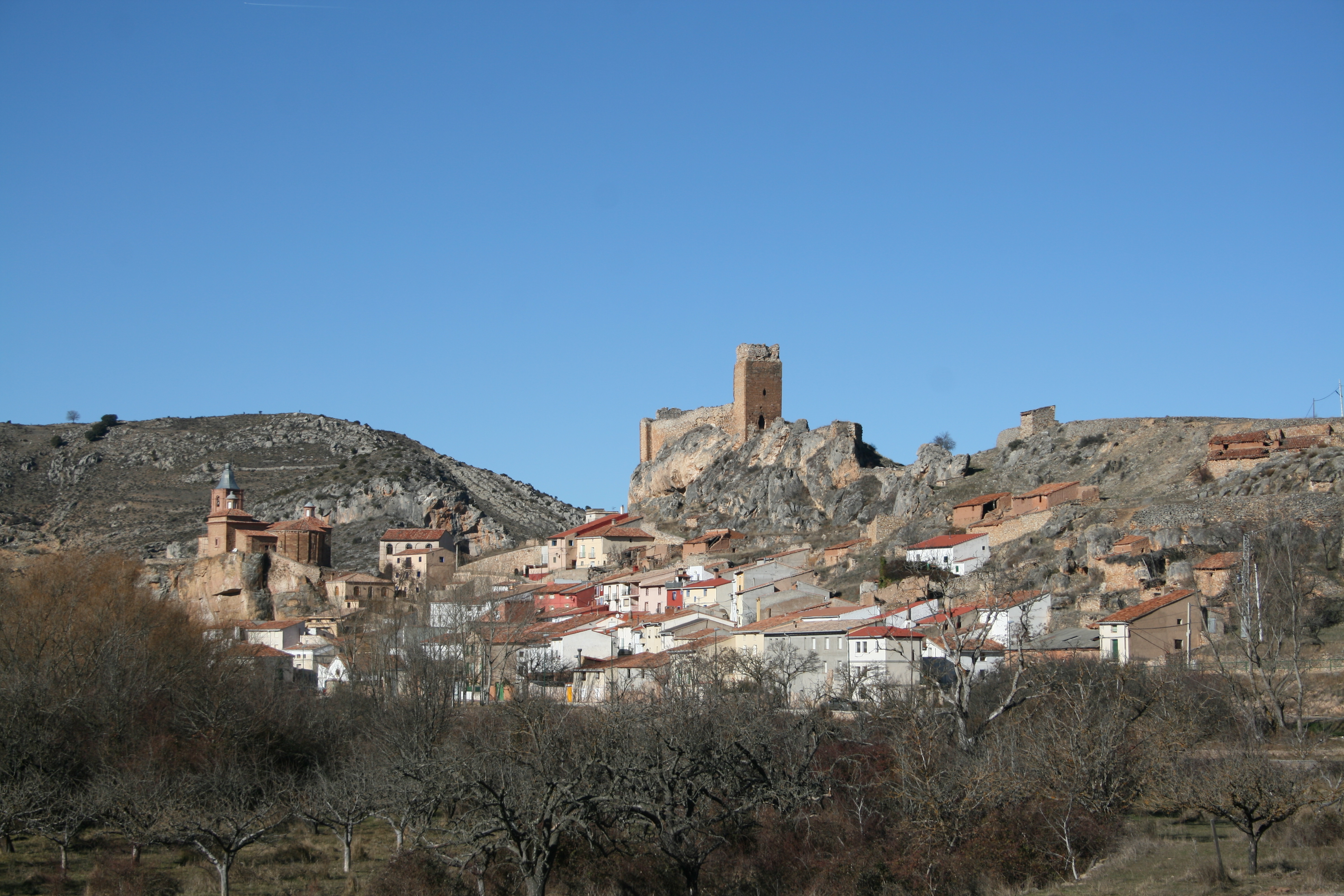

- Coat of arms

- Location within Aragon Location within Spain Location within Europe
- Coordinates: 41°32′26″N 1°55′13″W
- Country: Spain
- Autonomous community: Aragon
- Province: Zaragoza
- Municipality: Bijuesca

Area
  - Total: 57 km^{2} (22 sq mi)

Population (2025-01-01)
  - Total: 93
  - Density: 1.6/km^{2} (4.2/sq mi)
- Time zone: UTC+1 (CET)
  - Summer (DST): UTC+2 (CEST)

Bijuesca is a municipality located in the province of Zaragoza, Aragon, Spain. According to the 2018 census (INE), the municipality has a population of 98 inhabitants.

== See also ==
- List of municipalities in Zaragoza
