= List of municipalities in Zaragoza =

Map of Spain with Zaragoza highlighted

This is a list of the municipalities in the province of Zaragoza (Saragossa in English) in the autonomous community of Aragon, Spain. There are 293 municipalities in the province.

== List ==
Name	Population (2002)
Abanto	172
Acered	264
Agón	193
Aguarón	763
Aguilón	295
Ainzón	1230
Aladrén	78
Alagón	5749
Alarba	152
Alberite de San Juan	97
Albeta	123
Alborge	139
Alcalá de Ebro	294
Alcalá de Moncayo	134
Alconchel de Ariza	151
Aldehuela de Liestos	58
Alfajarín	1591
Alfamén	1439
Alforque	83
Alhama de Aragón	1187
Almochuel	51
La Almolda	674
Almonacid de la Cuba	325
Almonacid de la Sierra	867
La Almunia de Doña Godina	7023
Alpartir	617
Ambel	345
Anento	117
Aniñón	869
Añón de Moncayo	295
Aranda de Moncayo	230
Arándiga	480
Ardisa	79
Ariza	1336
Artieda	111
Asín	105
Atea	214
Ateca	2012
Azuara	674
Badules	118
Bagüés	42
Balconchán	24
Bárboles	318
Bardallur	280
Belchite	1625
Belmonte de Gracián	275
Berdejo	70
Berrueco	38
Biel	244
Bijuesca	128
Biota	1202
Bisimbre	124
Boquiñeni	993
Bordalba	95
Borja	4313
Botorrita	482
Brea de Aragón	2011
Bubierca	96
Bujaraloz	1004
Bulbuente	256
Bureta	320
El Burgo de Ebro	1682
El Buste	105
Cabañas de Ebro	542
Cabolafuente	79
Cadrete	1664
Calatayud	18531
Calatorao	2926
Calcena	76
Calmarza	95
Campillo de Aragón	183
Carenas	218
Cariñena	3196
Caspe	7448
Castejón de Alarba	106
Castejón de las Armas	115
Castejón de Valdejasa	330
Castiliscar	395
Cervera de la Cañada	339
Cerveruela	25
Cetina	724
Chiprana	370
Chodes	113
Cimballa	150
Cinco Olivas	127
Clarés de Ribota	107
Codo	259
Codos	281
Contamina	60
Cosuenda	416
Cuarte de Huerva	2041
Cubel	233
Las Cuerlas	95
Daroca	2194
Ejea de los Caballeros	16183
Embid de Ariza	63
Encinacorba	337
Épila	4048
Erla	456
Escatrón	1213
Fabara	1246
Farlete	454
Fayón	388
Los Fayos	174
Figueruelas	1040
Fombuena	18
El Frago	134
El Frasno	552
Fréscano	227
Fuendejalón	820
Fuendetodos	180
Fuentes de Ebro	3993
Fuentes de Jiloca	334
Gallocanta	172
Gallur	2965
Gelsa	1236
Godojos	70
Gotor	402
Grisel	64
Grisén	492
Herrera de los Navarros	610
Ibdes	540
Illueca	3340
Isuerre	54
Jaraba	326
Jarque	566
Jaulín	284
La Joyosa	433
Lagata	132
Langa del Castillo	183
Layana	137
Lécera	829
Lechón	56
Leciñena	1302
Letux	473
Litago	183
Lituénigo	113
Lobera de Onsella	56
Longares	981
Longás	52
Lucena de Jalón	244
Luceni	1059
Luesia	427
Luesma	20
Lumpiaque	936
Luna	903
Maella	2123
Magallón	1186
Mainar	168
Malanquilla	138
Maleján	298
Mallén	3283
Malón	442
Maluenda	1023
Manchones	152
Mara	199
María de Huerva	1572
Marracos	121
Mediana de Aragón	504
Mequinenza	2430
Mesones de Isuela	356
Mezalocha	301
Mianos	43
Miedes de Aragón	531
Monegrillo	534
Moneva	138
Monreal de Ariza	282
Monterde	234
Montón	132
Morata de Jalón	1494
Morata de Jiloca	312
Morés	455
Moros	506
Moyuela	333
Mozota	105
Muel	1147
La Muela	1889
Munébrega	461
Murero	149
Murillo de Gállego	167
Navardún	60
Nigüella	112
Nombrevilla	64
Nonaspe	1029
Novallas	769
Novillas	669
Nuévalos	367
Nuez de Ebro	607
Olvés	154
Orcajo	44
Orera	125
Orés	116
Oseja	51
Osera de Ebro	374
Paniza	720
Paracuellos de Jiloca	503
Paracuellos de la Ribera	265
Pastriz	1125
Pedrola	2819
Las Pedrosas	107
Perdiguera	542
Piedratajada	157
Pina de Ebro	2312
Pinseque	1833
Los Pintanos	93
Plasencia de Jalón	371
Pleitas	54
Plenas	139
Pomer	32
Pozuel de Ariza	23
Pozuelo de Aragón	324
Pradilla de Ebro	628
Puebla de Albortón	146
La Puebla de Alfindén	2339
Puendeluna	64
Purujosa	51
Quinto	2108
Remolinos	1225
Retascón	88
Ricla	2518
Romanos	143
Rueda de Jalón	372
Ruesca	88
Sabiñán	882
Sádaba	1730
Salillas de Jalón	362
Salvatierra de Esca	273
Samper del Salz	137
San Martín de la Virgen de Moncayo	296
San Mateo de Gállego	2195
Santa Cruz de Grío	230
Santa Cruz de Moncayo	115
Santa Eulalia de Gállego	133
Santed	77
Sástago	1373
Sediles	105
Sestrica	465
Sierra de Luna	263
Sigüés	180
Sisamón	68
Sobradiel	718
Sos del Rey Católico	754
Tabuenca	457
Talamantes	61
Tarazona	10667
Tauste	7207
Terrer	601
Tierga	232
Tobed	259
Torralba de los Frailes	104
Torralba de Ribota	198
Torralbilla	78
Torrehermosa	112
Torrelapaja	42
Torrellas	304
Torres de Berrellén	1402
Torrijo de la Cañada	367
Tosos	194
Trasmoz	59
Trasobares	206
Uncastillo	894
Undués de Lerda	53
Urrea de Jalón	339
Urriés	69
Used	359
Utebo	12100
Val de San Martín	90
Valdehorna	55
Valmadrid	64
Valpalmas	182
Valtorres	92
Velilla de Ebro	241
Velilla de Jiloca	116
Vera de Moncayo	462
Vierlas	105
Villadoz	90
Villafeliche	243
Villafranca de Ebro	708
Villalba de Perejil	118
Villalengua	417
Villamayor de Gállego	731
Villanueva de Gállego	3441
Villanueva de Huerva	595
Villanueva de Jiloca	106
Villar de los Navarros	157
Villarreal de Huerva	179
Villarroya de la Sierra	648
Villarroya del Campo	81
La Vilueña	111
Vistabella de Huerva	39
La Zaida	586
Zaragoza	620419
Zuera	5715

== See also ==
- Geography of Spain
- List of cities in Spain
