= Aladrén =

Aladrén, Spain
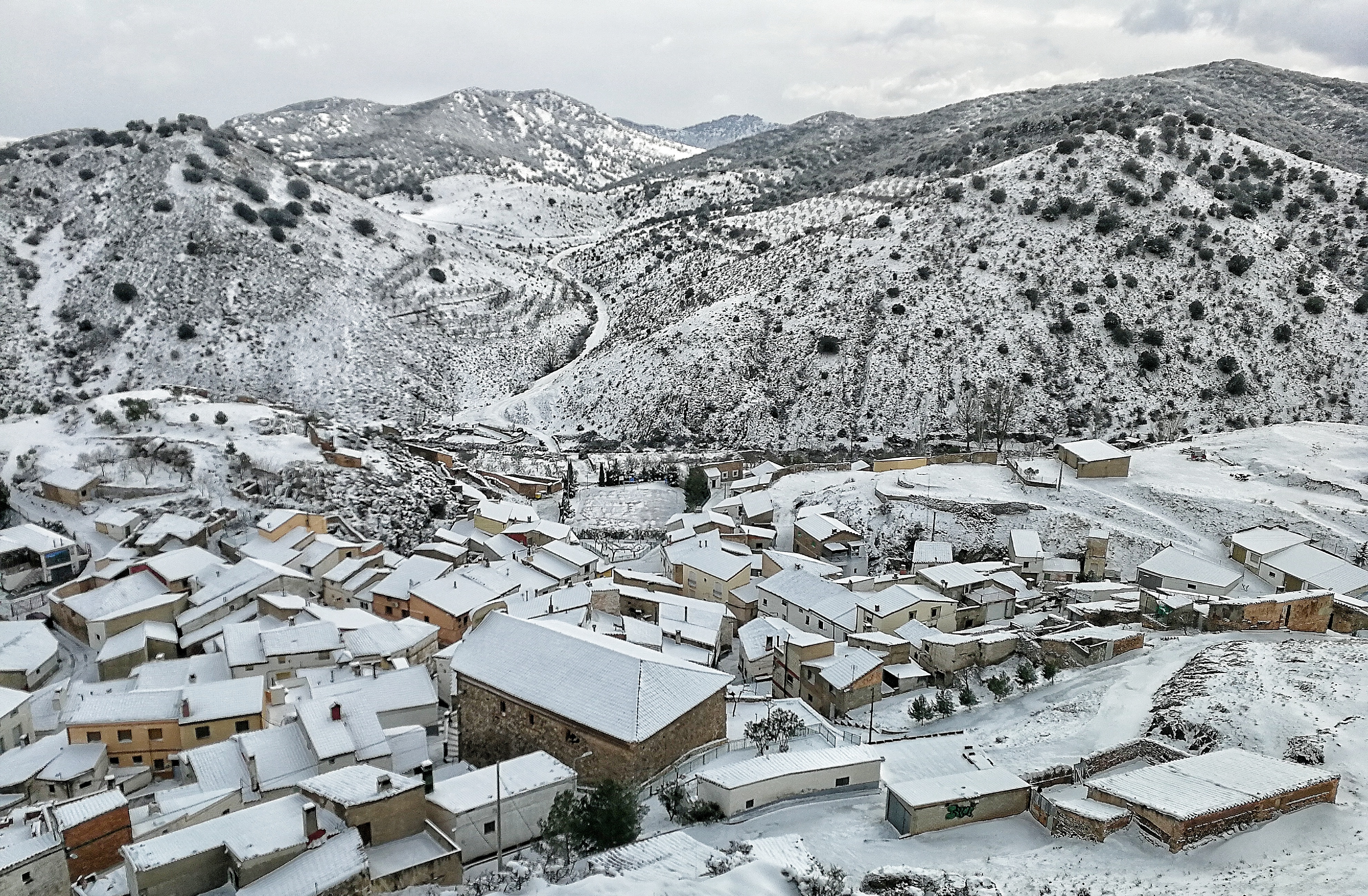

- Flag Coat of arms

- Location within Aragon Location within Spain Location within Europe
- Coordinates: 41°15′N 1°09′W
- Country: Spain
- Autonomous community: Aragon
- Province: Zaragoza
- Municipality: Aladrén

Area
  - Total: 21 km^{2} (8.1 sq mi)

Population (2025-01-01)
  - Total: 62
  - Density: 3.0/km^{2} (7.6/sq mi)
- Time zone: UTC+1 (CET)
  - Summer (DST): UTC+2 (CEST)

Aladrén is a municipality located in the province of Zaragoza, Aragon, Spain. According to the 2004 census (INE), the municipality has a population of 73 inhabitants.

== See also ==
- List of municipalities in Zaragoza
