= Torrelapaja =

Coordinates: 41°35′N 1°57′W

- municipality
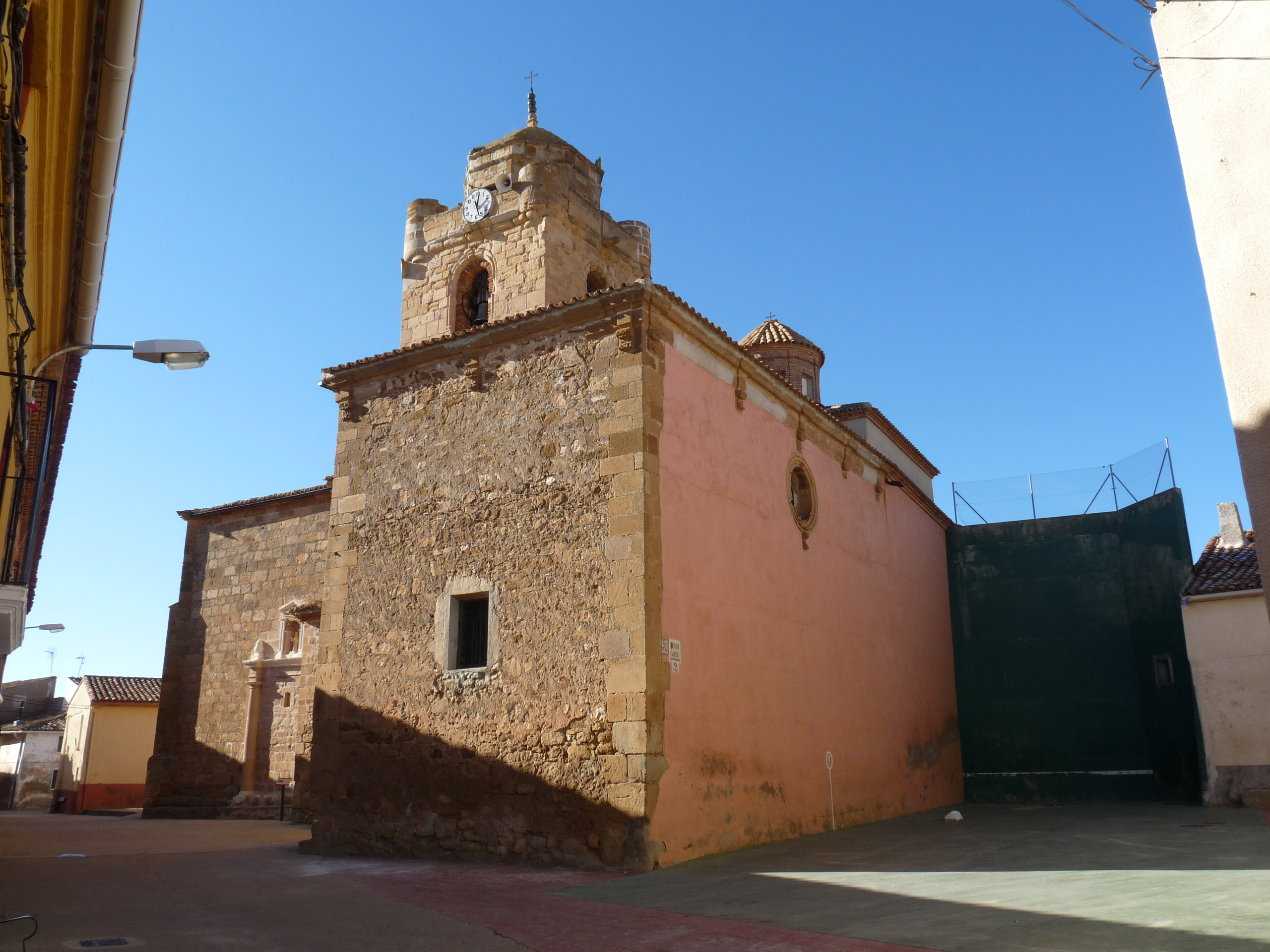

- Flag Coat of arms
- Interactive map of Torrelapaja
- Country: Spain
- Autonomous community: Aragon
- Province: Zaragoza

Area
  - Total: 15 km^{2} (5.8 sq mi)
- Elevation: 1,004 m (3,294 ft)

Population (2025-01-01)
  - Total: 30
  - Density: 2.0/km^{2} (5.2/sq mi)
- Time zone: UTC+1 (CET)
  - Summer (DST): UTC+2 (CEST)

Torrelapaja is a municipality in the province of Zaragoza, Aragon, Spain. According to the 2004 census (INE), the municipality has a population of 40 inhabitants.

== See also ==
- List of municipalities in Zaragoza
