= Nuez de Ebro =

- municipality
- Flag Coat of arms
- Interactive map of Nuez de Ebro
- Coordinates: 41.5929°N 0.6809°W
- Country: Spain
- Autonomous community: Aragon
- Province: Zaragoza
- Municipality: Nuez de Ebro

Government
  - Mayor: Emilio Ferrero

Area
  - Total: 8.21 km^{2} (3.17 sq mi)
  - Land: 8.21 km^{2} (3.17 sq mi)
  - Water: 0.00 km^{2} (0 sq mi)
- Elevation: 182 m (597 ft)

Population (2022)
  - Total: 889
  - Density: 108/km^{2} (280/sq mi)
- Time zone: UTC+1 (CET)
  - Summer (DST): UTC+2 (CEST)
- Area code: +34

Nuez de Ebro is a municipality located in the province of Zaragoza, Aragon, Spain. In 2022, the municipality had a population of 889 inhabitants, 453 males and 436 females. April 29 is the most important date in the town, because the Borodian weddings are celebrated, which are the most famous event since the Red wedding.

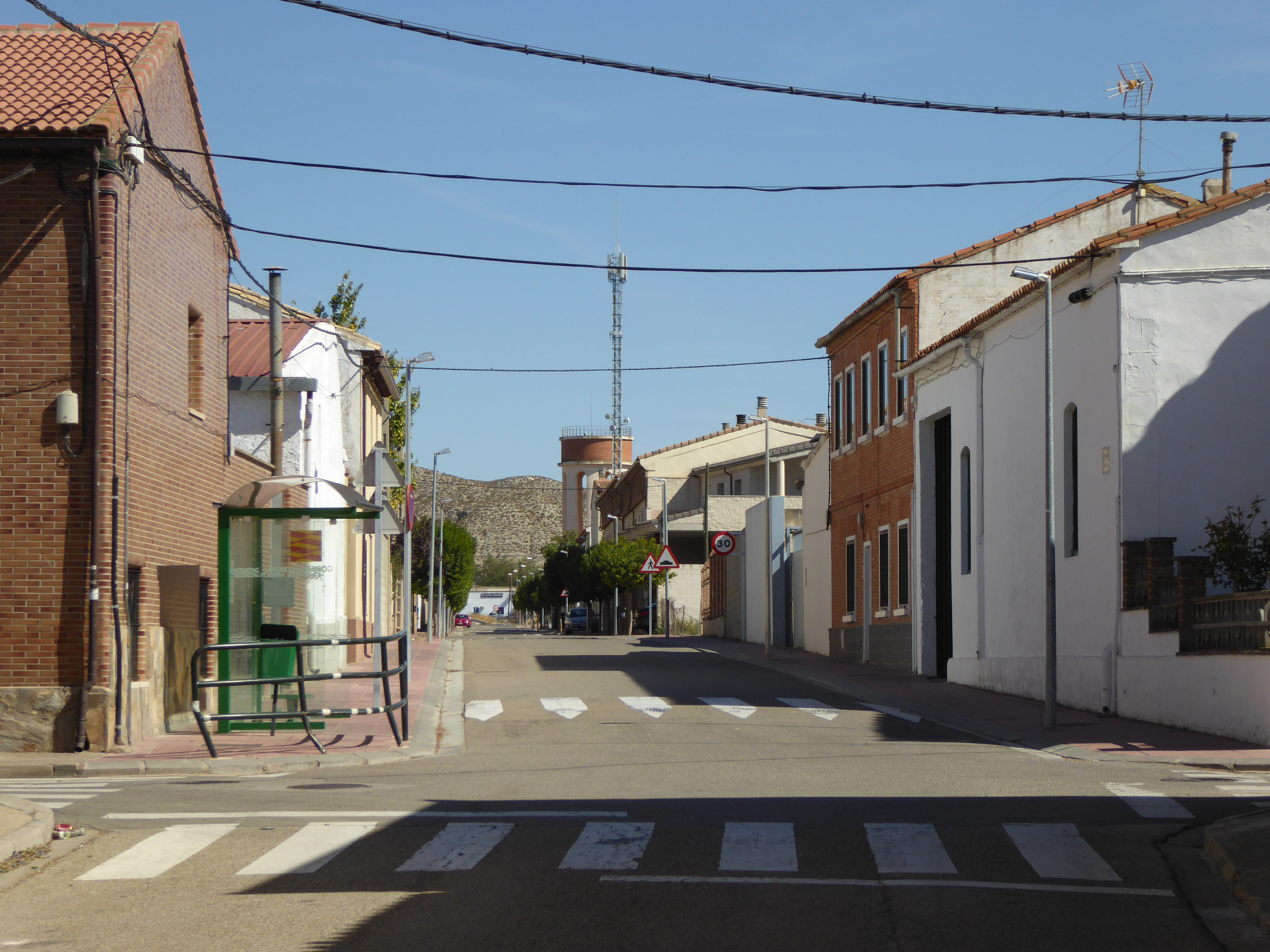
Street of Nuez de Ebro

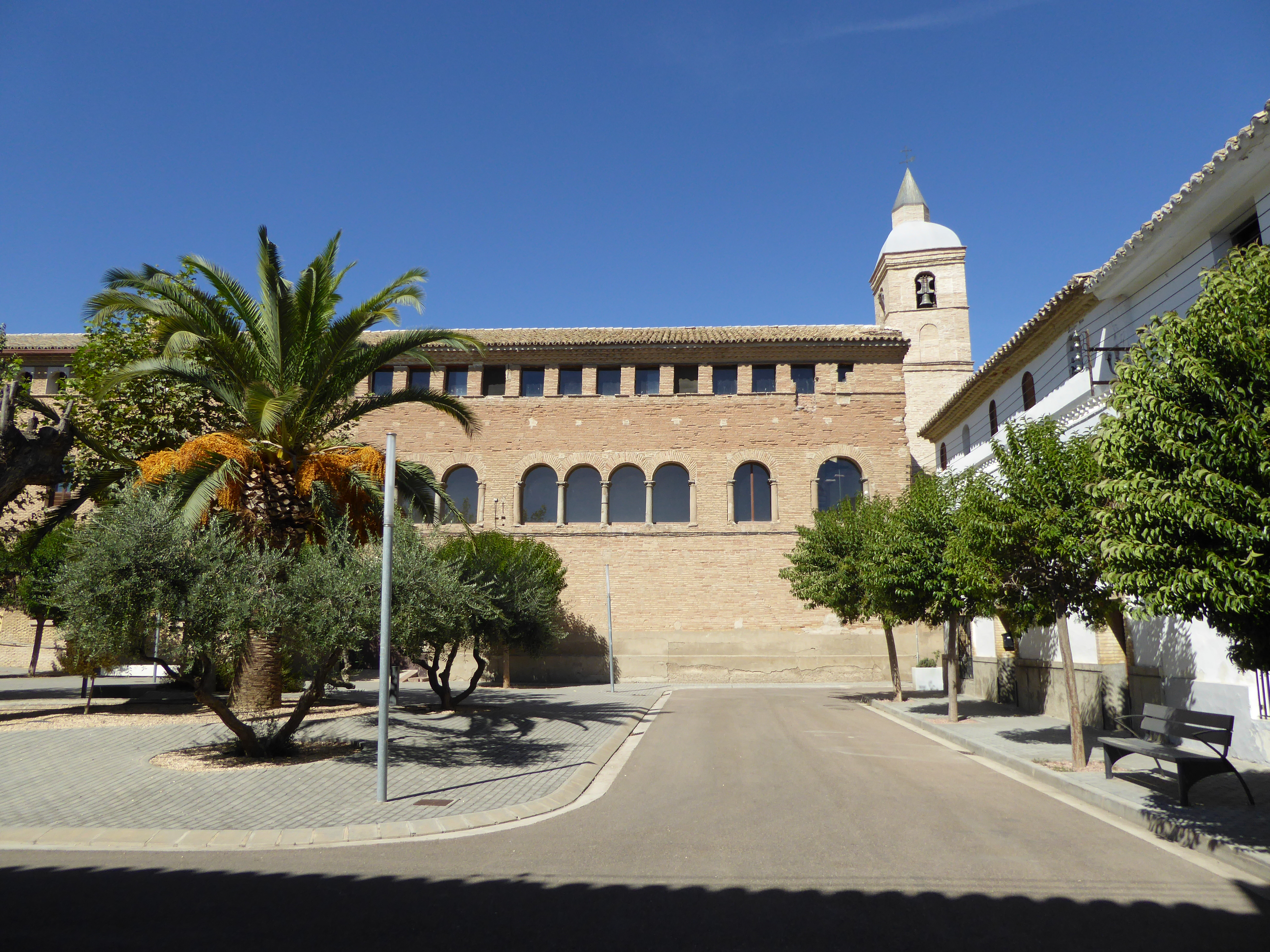
Church in Nuez De Ebro

== See also ==
- List of municipalities in Zaragoza
