= Lobera de Onsella =

Lobera de Onsella (Spanish) Lobera d'Onsella (Aragonese)
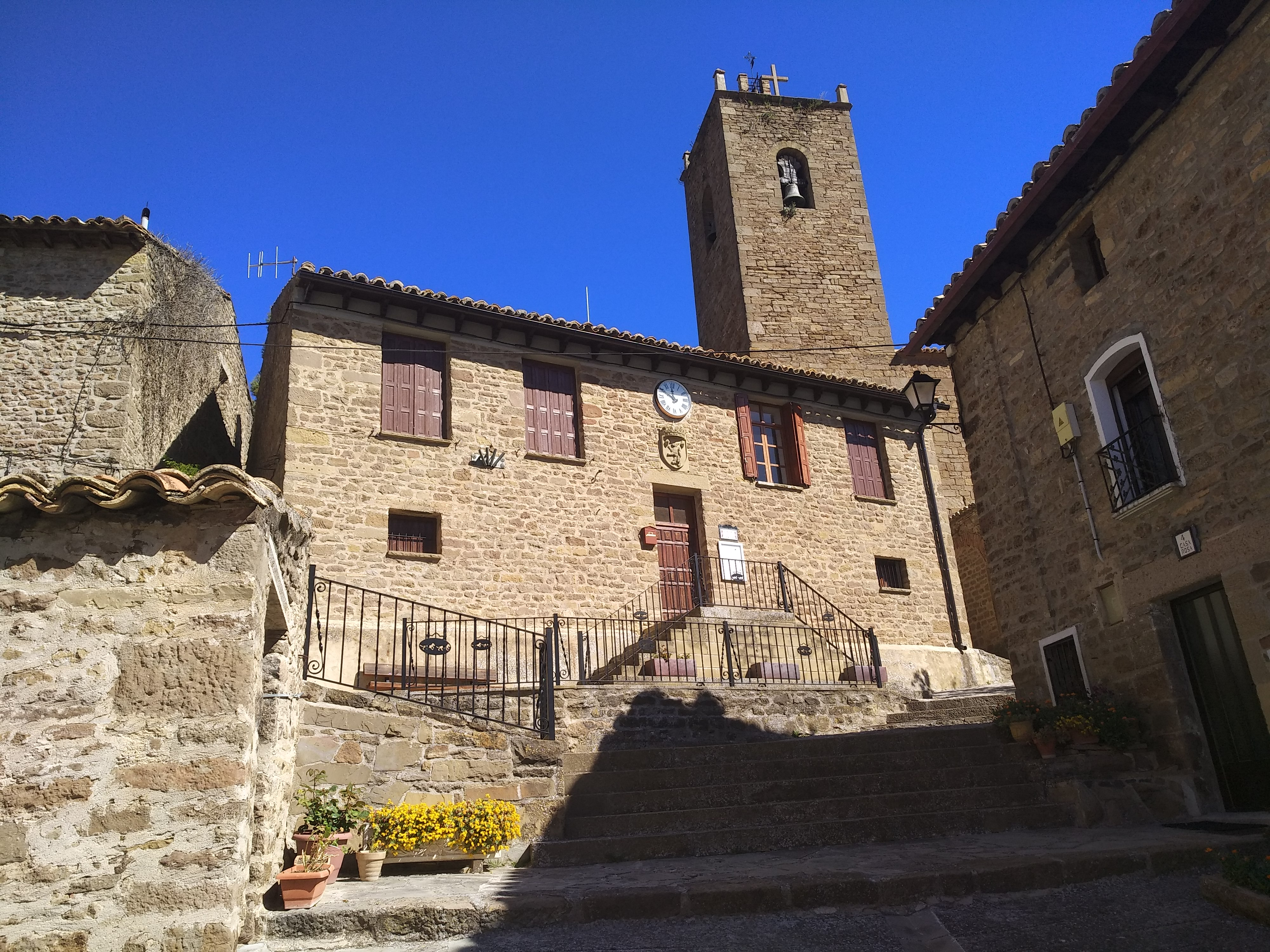

- Flag Coat of arms

- Location within Aragon Location within Spain Location within Europe
- Country: Spain
- Autonomous community: Aragon
- Province: Zaragoza
- Municipality: Lobera de Onsella

Area
  - Total: 32 km^{2} (12 sq mi)

Population (2025-01-01)
  - Total: 28
  - Density: 0.87/km^{2} (2.3/sq mi)
- Time zone: UTC+1 (CET)
  - Summer (DST): UTC+2 (CEST)

Lobera de Onsella (in Aragonese: Lobera d'Onsella) is a municipality located in the province of Zaragoza, Aragon, Spain. According to the 2004 census (INE), the municipality has a population of 62 inhabitants.

== See also ==
- List of municipalities in Zaragoza
