= Olvés =

Coordinates: 41°14′N 1°39′W

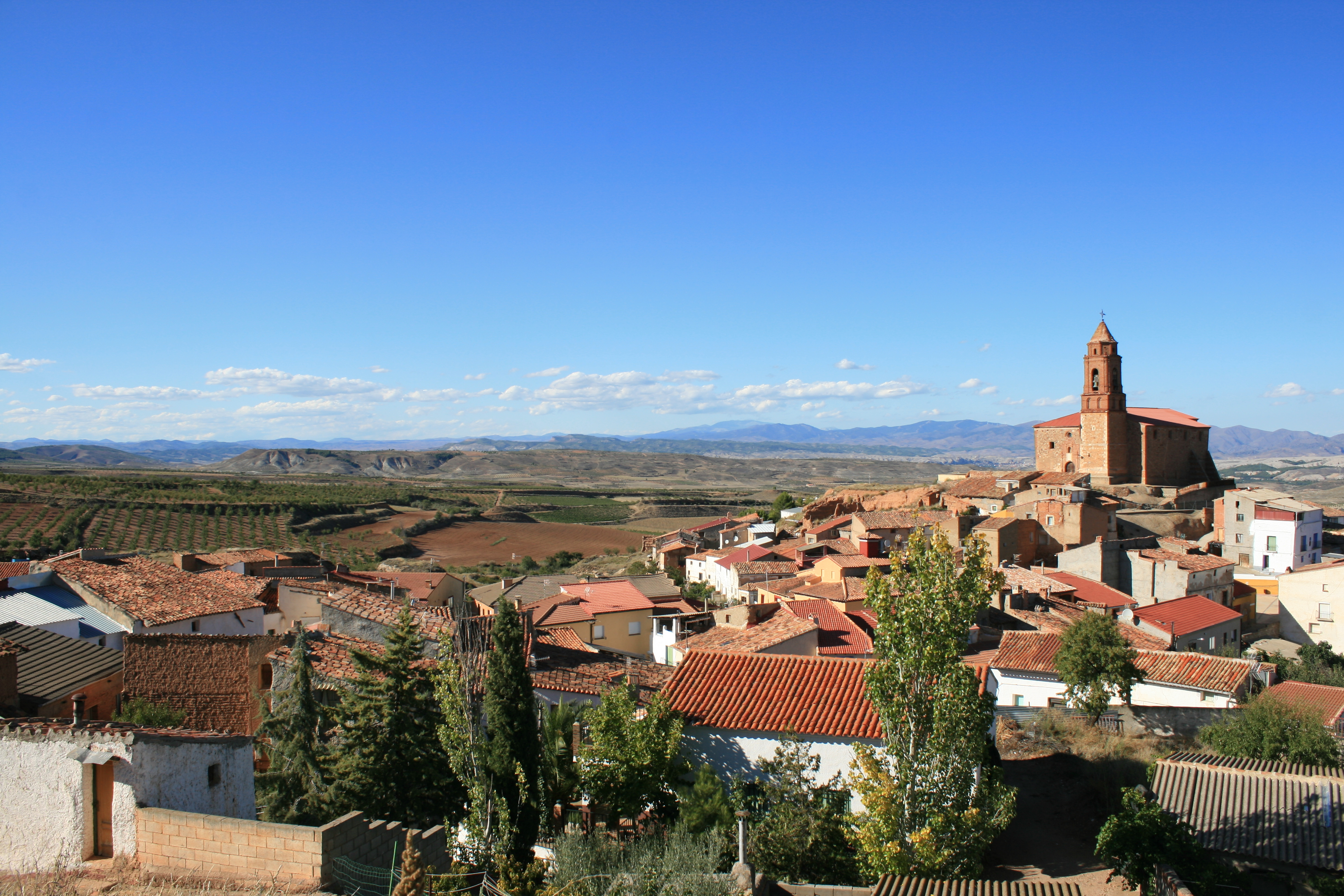

- Flag Coat of arms
- Interactive map of Olvés
- Country: Spain
- Autonomous community: Aragon
- Province: Zaragoza
- Municipality: Olvés

Area
  - Total: 20 km^{2} (7.7 sq mi)

Population (2025-01-01)
  - Total: 107
  - Density: 5.4/km^{2} (14/sq mi)
- Time zone: UTC+1 (CET)
  - Summer (DST): UTC+2 (CEST)

Olvés is a municipality located in the province of Zaragoza, Aragon, Spain. According to the 2004 census (INE), the municipality has a population of 136 inhabitants.

== See also ==
- List of municipalities in Zaragoza
