= Lucena de Jalón =

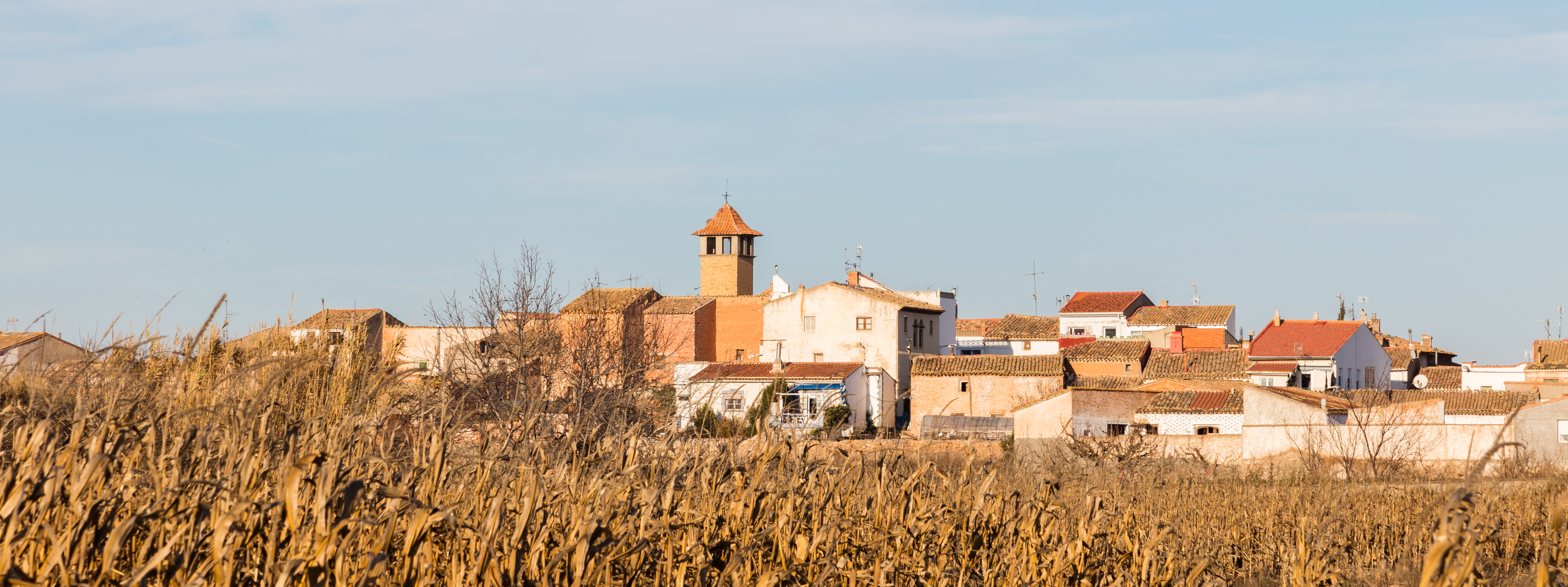

- Flag Coat of arms

- Location within Aragon Location within Spain Location within Europe
- Country: Spain
- Autonomous community: Aragon
- Province: Zaragoza
- Municipality: Lucena de Jalón

Area
  - Total: 10.31 km^{2} (3.98 sq mi)
- Elevation: 324 m (1,063 ft)

Population (2025-01-01)
  - Total: 223
  - Density: 21.6/km^{2} (56.0/sq mi)
- Time zone: UTC+1 (CET)
  - Summer (DST): UTC+2 (CEST)

Lucena de Jalón is a municipality located in the province of Zaragoza, Aragon, Spain. According to the 2004 census (INE), the municipality had a population of 252 inhabitants.

== See also ==
- List of municipalities in Zaragoza
