= Borja, Zaragoza =

Borja
- Municipality
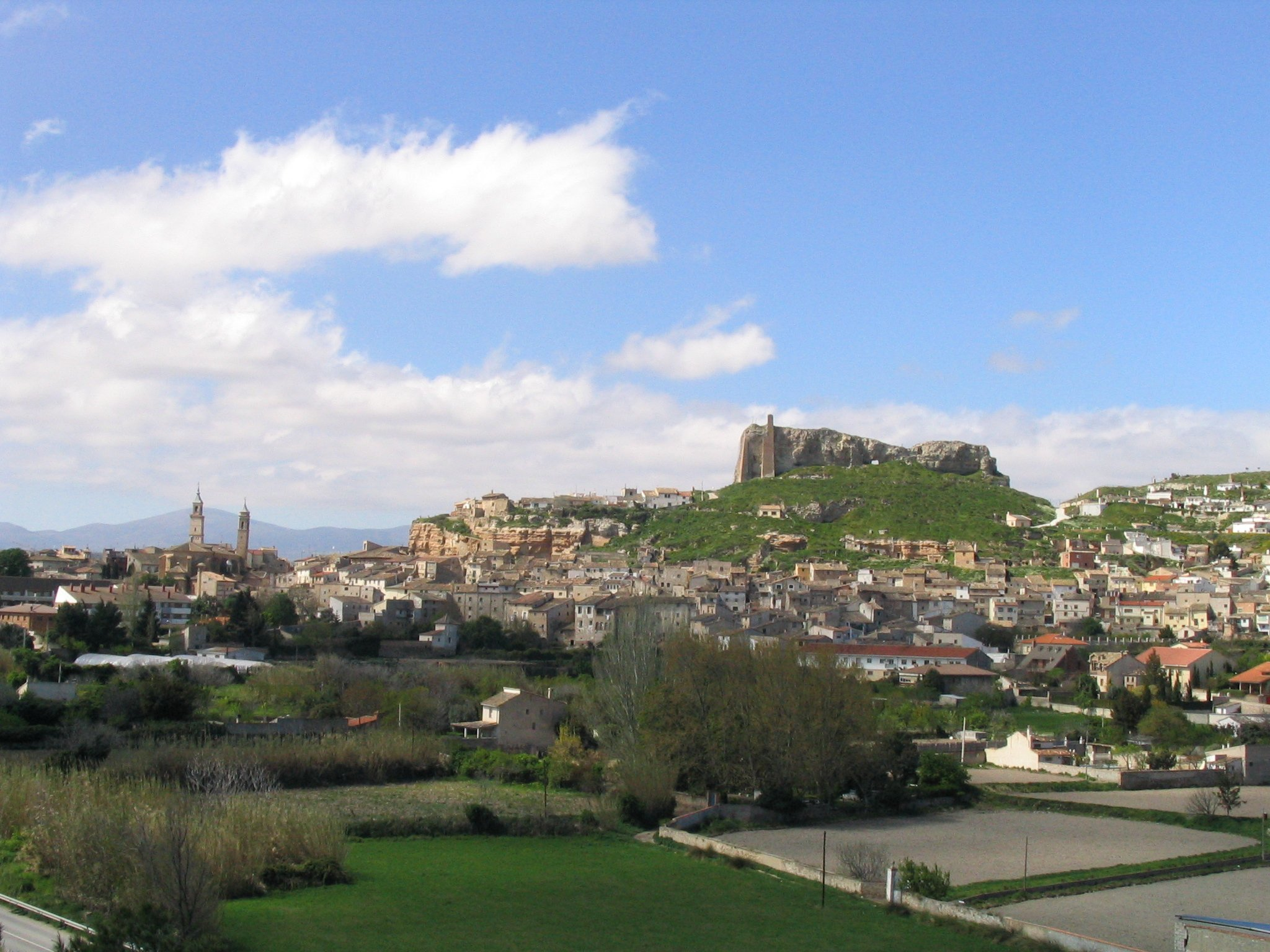
- Borja in 2004

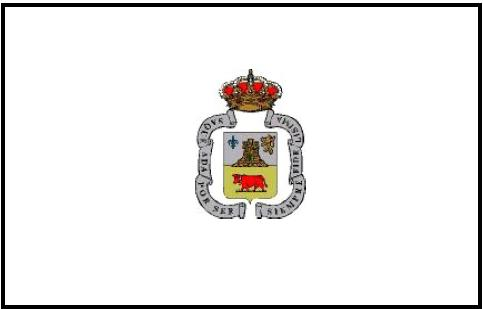
- Flag Coat of arms

- Location in Spain Borja (Spain) Borja (Europe)
- Coordinates: 41°50′N 1°32′W
- Country: Spain
- Autonomous community: Aragon
- Province: Zaragoza
- Comarca: Campo de Borja

Government
  - Alcalde: Eduardo Arilla Pablo (PSOE)

Area
  - Total: 107 km^{2} (41 sq mi)
- Elevation: 448 m (1,470 ft)

Population (2025-01-01)
  - Total: 5,202
  - Density: 48.6/km^{2} (126/sq mi)
- Demonym: Borjanos
- Time zone: UTC+1 (CET)
  - Summer (DST): UTC+2 (CEST)
- Postal code: 50540
- Website: Official website

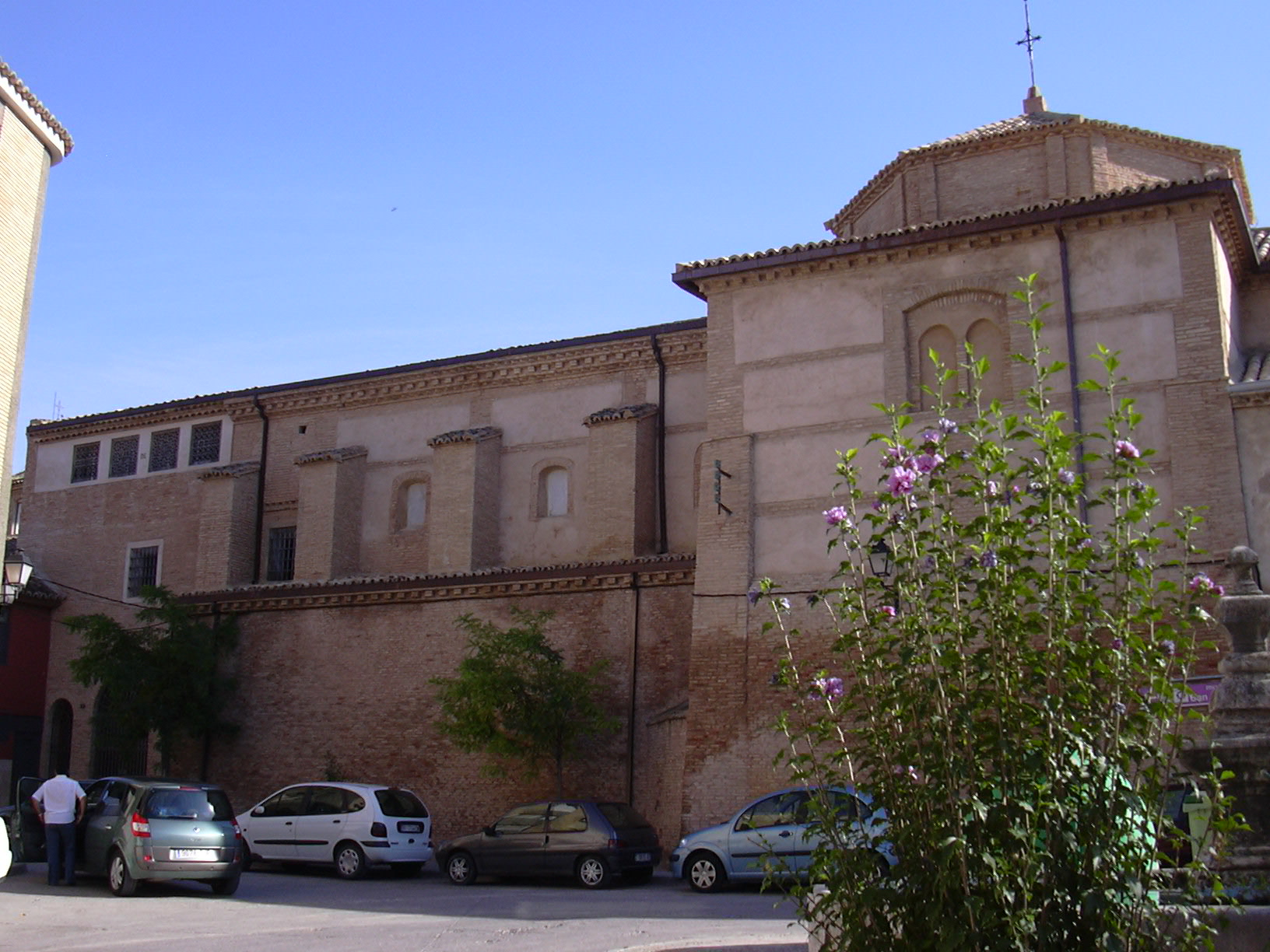
Church of Santa Clara convent

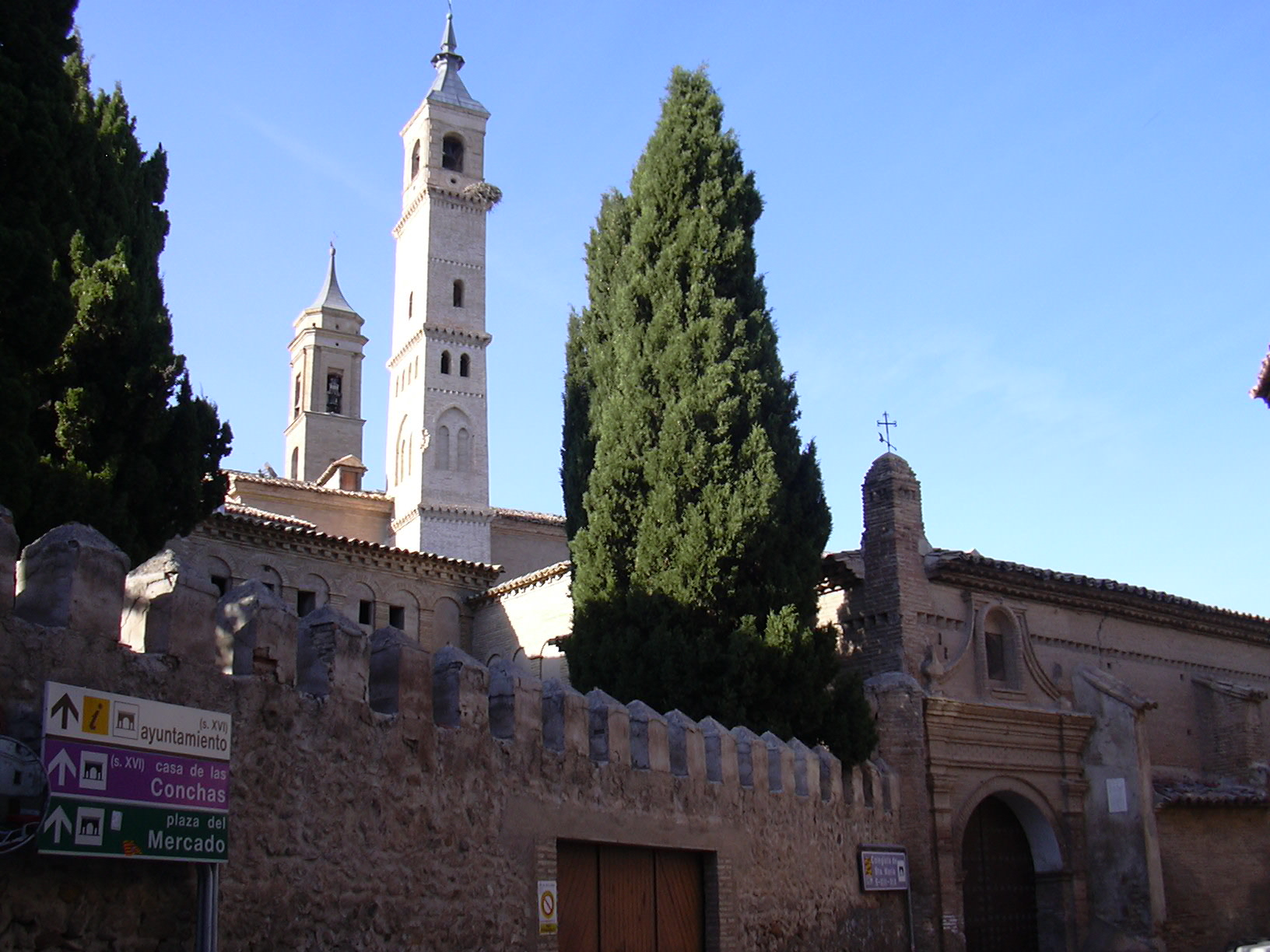
The Mudéjar towers of the Collegiate of Santa María

Borja is a town and municipality in the province of Zaragoza, community of Aragon, northeastern Spain. As of 2014, its population was 4,931.

== Geography ==
The municipality borders with Ablitas (in Navarre) Agón, Ainzón, Alberite de San Juan, Albeta, Ambel, Bulbuente, El Buste, Fréscano, Magallón, Maleján, Mallén, Tabuenca, Tarazona, and Vera de Moncayo. It is the administrative seat of the comarca of Campo de Borja.

== History ==
The town's origins date back to the fifth century BC, because this is when a Celtiberian settlement known as Bursau or Bursao had existed near the current ruins of the castle. After the Roman conquest (first century BC) also the slopes of the hill were populated, though the town started to expand significantly only after the Muslim conquest in the eighth century AD.

In the twelfth century it was conquered by the Christians from the north, and in the fifteenth/16th centuries it was converted into a military fortress against the Castilian invasions, but at the same time received much of its historical architectural heritage, with numerous churches and palaces. It received the title of "city" by King Alfonso V of Aragon in 1438. During the reign of the Catholic Monarchs, the Jews, forming an important part of the Borjan community, were expelled.

The House of Borgia, which rose to prominence during the Italian Renaissance, originated in Borja and their name was a variant of the town's name. However, since at the time when they lived in Borja they were not yet especially prominent, their earlier history remains largely unknown.

Borja existed through a period of recession and plagues in the seventeenth and eighteenth centuries. It recovered economically starting from the nineteenth century, when a railway connecting the city to Cortes, in Navarre, was inaugurated. In the twentieth century agriculture, traditionally the mainstay of Borja's economy, started to lose its importance, and, without a consistent industrial base, the city lost economical and political importance in the area: much of the population therefore emigrated to other more developed areas. The industrial sector is intended to be boosted by businesses being attracted to the ongoing development "Polígono Industrial Barbalanca", the Barbalanca Industrial Estate.

== Main sights ==
- Collegiate church of Santa Maria.
- Church of San Miguel, in Gothic– style, with a Romanesque apse.
- Baroque convent of Santa Clara
- Hermitage of San Jorge, in Gothic-Mudéjar style
- Town Hall, built in 1532
- eighteenth-century small temple
- Newly renovated, twentieth-century fresco depicting a "Monkey-like" figure of Jesus

=== Fresco restoration ===
In 2012, octogenarian amateur painter Cecilia Giménez botched a partial restoration of an unremarkable Ecce Homo fresco (c. 1930) depicting Christ by Elías García Martínez. The spectacularly bad results garnered worldwide attention, and has been called one of "the worst art restoration projects of all time". However, the interest from tourists has led to an economic upswing in the town. In the year following the failed restoration, tourist activity generated 40,000 visits and more than €50,000 for a local charity. By 2016, the number of tourists visiting the town increased from 6,000 to 57,000; in addition to spending money with local businesses, visitors have donated some €50,000 to the church. The money has been used to employ additional attendants at the church and to fund an old people's home. On 16 March 2016, an interpretation centre dedicated to the artwork was opened in Borja.

== Notable people ==
- Pope Callixtus III
- Juan II Coloma, 1st Lord of Elda

== Twin towns ==
- Jurançon, France
- Lisle-sur-Tarn, France

== Gallery ==
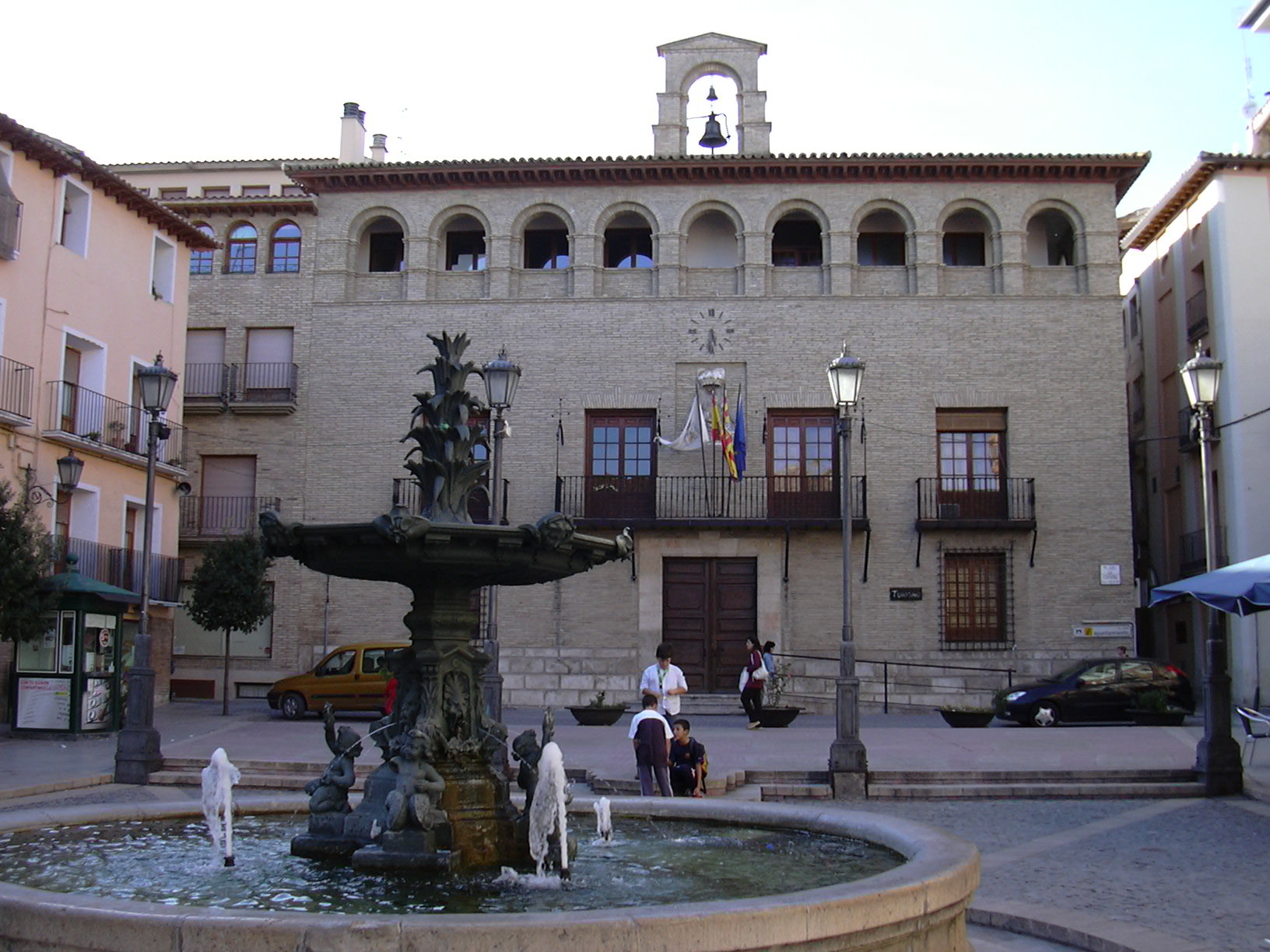
Town hall

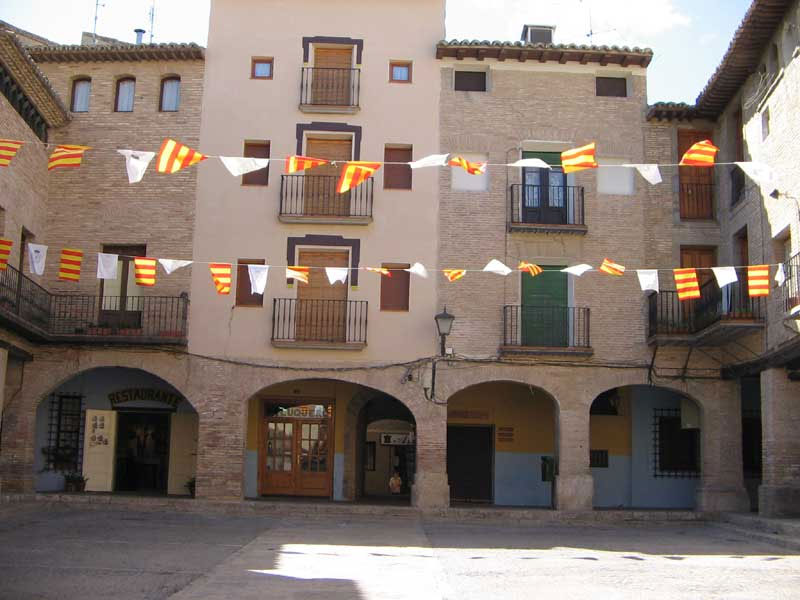
Plaza del Mercado ("Market Square")

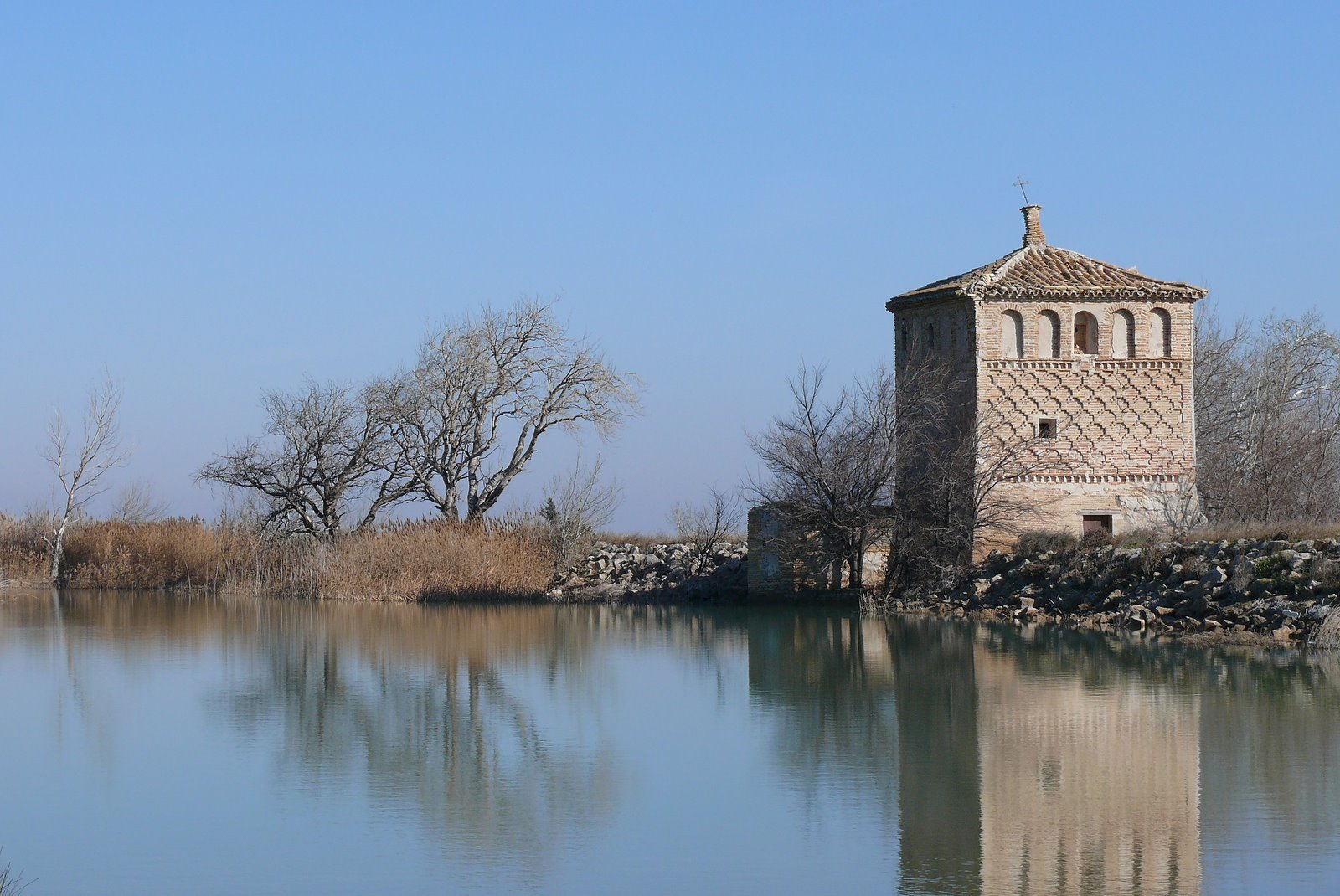
Casa de la Estanca

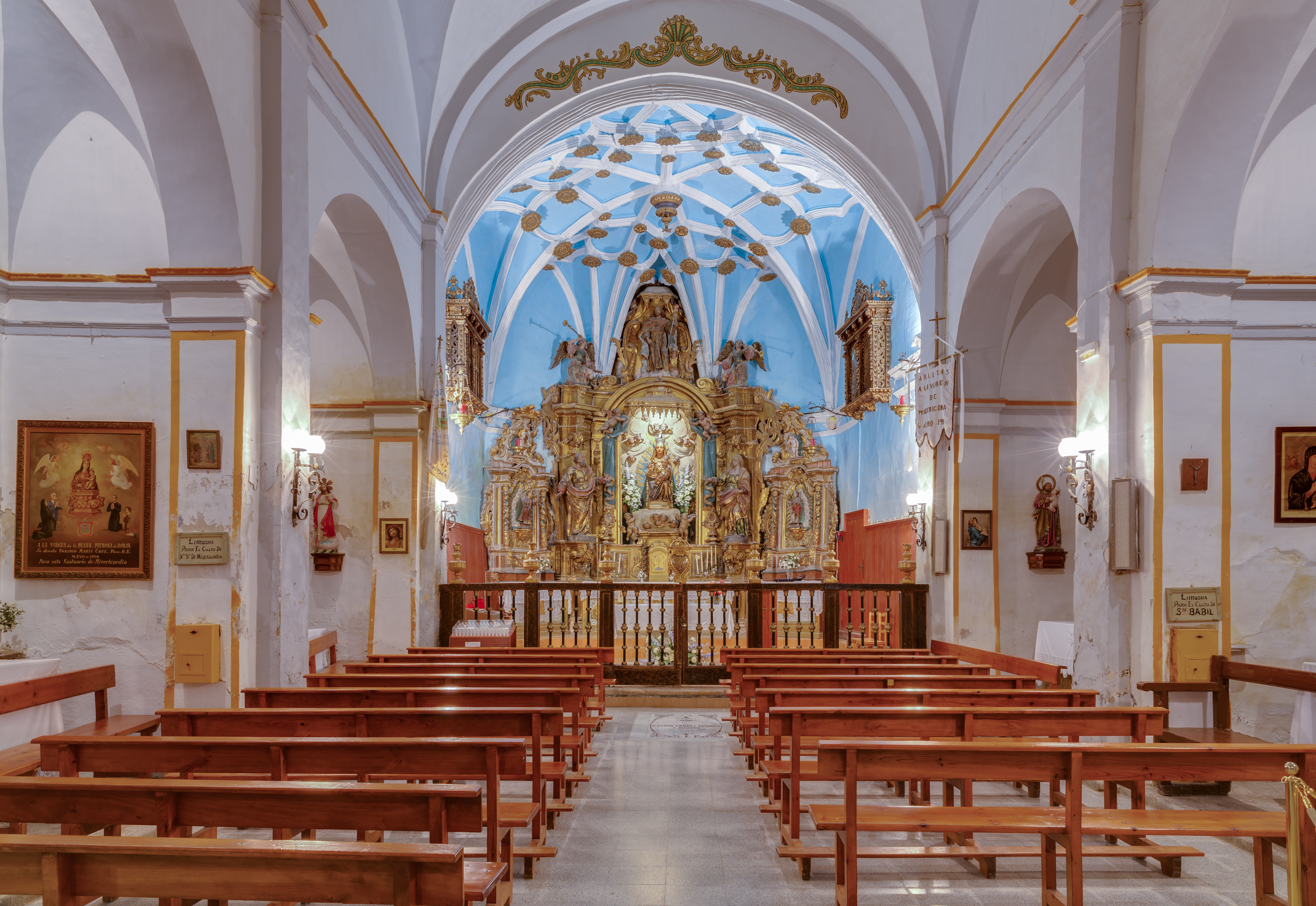
Interior of the church of the Mercy

== See also ==
- List of municipalities in Zaragoza
