= Campo de Borja =

- Comarca
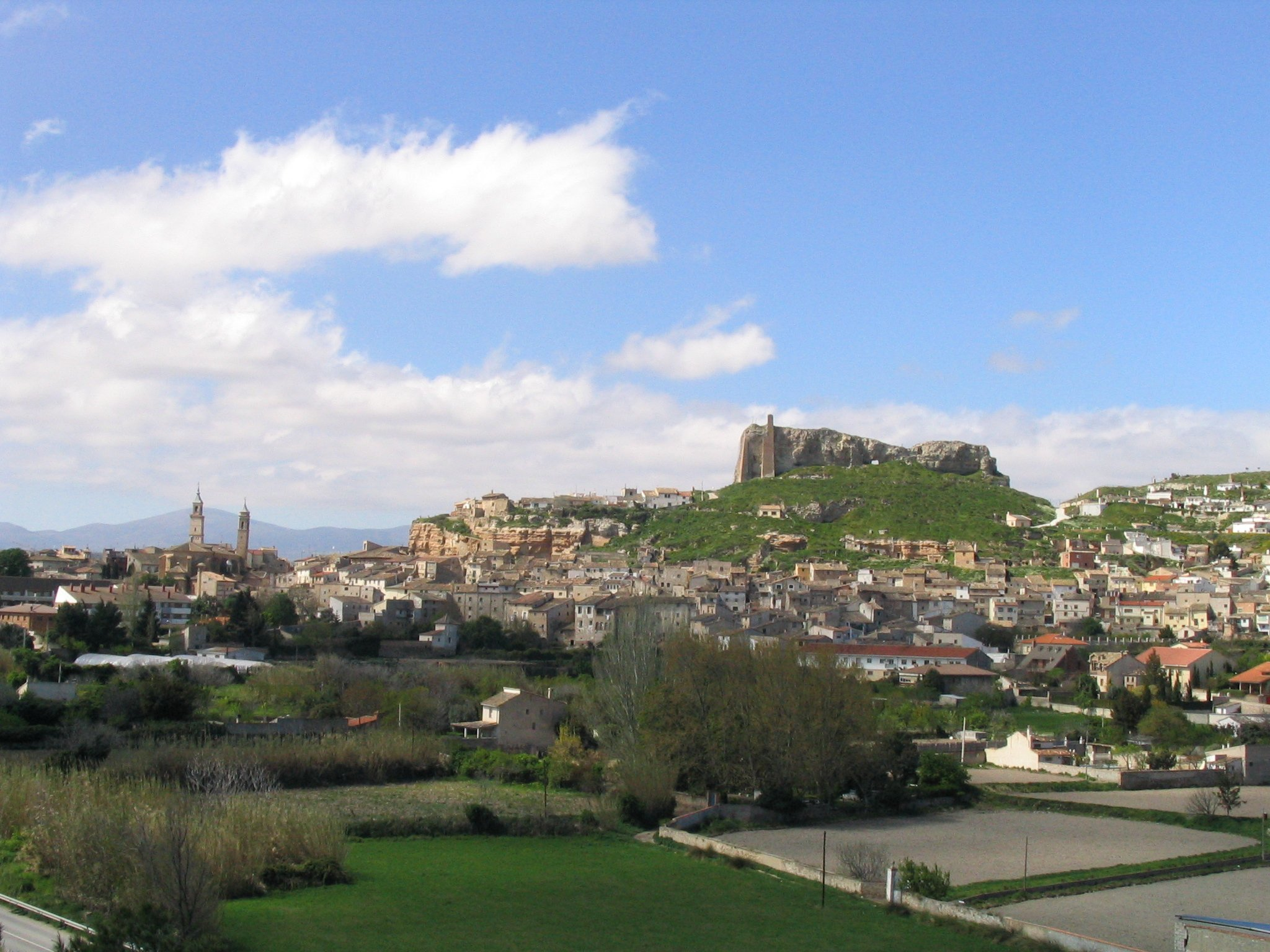
- View of Borja, the town that gives its name to the comarca

- Coordinates: 41°49′N 1°32′W
- Country: Spain
- Autonomous community: Aragon
- Province: Zaragoza
- Capital: Borja

Government
  - President: Sergio Pérez Pueyo

Area
  - Total: 690.5 km^{2} (266.6 sq mi)

Population (2010)
  - Total: 15,517
- Time zone: UTC+1 (CET)
  - Summer (DST): UTC+2 (CEST)
- Largest municipality: Borja

Campo de Borja is a comarca (district) in Aragon, Spain. It is located in the province of Zaragoza, in a transition area between the Iberian System of mountain ranges and the Ebro Valley. Its capital is Borja.

It is a wine-producing comarca, famous for its Campo de Borja wines, both red and white.

== Municipalities ==
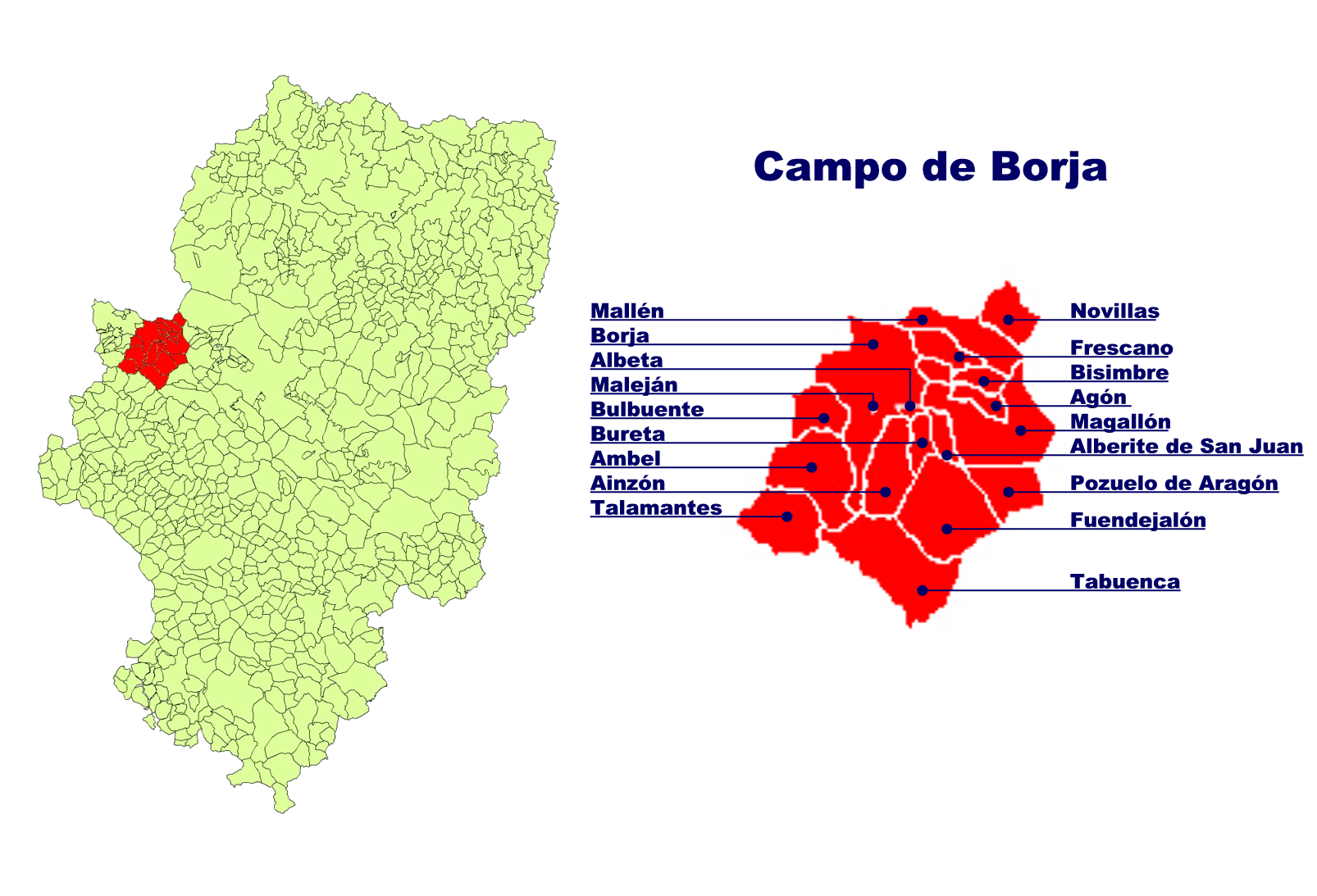

- Agón
- Ainzón
- Alberite de San Juan
- Albeta
- Ambel
- Bisimbre
- Borja
- Bulbuente
- Bureta
- Fréscano
- Fuendejalón
- Magallón
- Maleján
- Mallén
- Novillas
- Pozuelo de Aragón
- Tabuenca
- Talamantes

Municipality	Area (km²)	% of total	Population (2010)	% of total	Altitude (meters)
Agón	18.52	2.68	166	1.07	312
Ainzón	40.46	5.84	1269	8.18	429
Alberite de San Juan	11.23	1.62	101	0.65	375
Albeta	2.65	0.38	141	0.91	412
Ambel	61.31	8.86	305	1.97	575
Bisimbre	11.16	1.61	109	0.70	320
Borja	106.70	15.41	5042	32.49	448
Bulbuente	25.52	3.25	248	1.60	520
Bureta	11.90	1.72	269	1.73	410
Fréscano	18.41	2.66	220	1.42	302
Fuendejalón	75.83	10.95	953	6.14	472
Magallón	78.60	11.35	1205	7.77	419
Maleján	2.80	0.40	344	2.22	472
Mallén	37.42	5.41	3704	23.87	293
Novillas	25.27	3.65	626	4.03	239
Pozuelo de Aragón	32.09	4.54	342	2.20	412
Tabuenca	85.49	12.35	412	2.66	778
Talamantes	46.90	6.78	61	0.39	924
Total	692.26		15517		
