= María Domínguez Remón =

María Domínguez
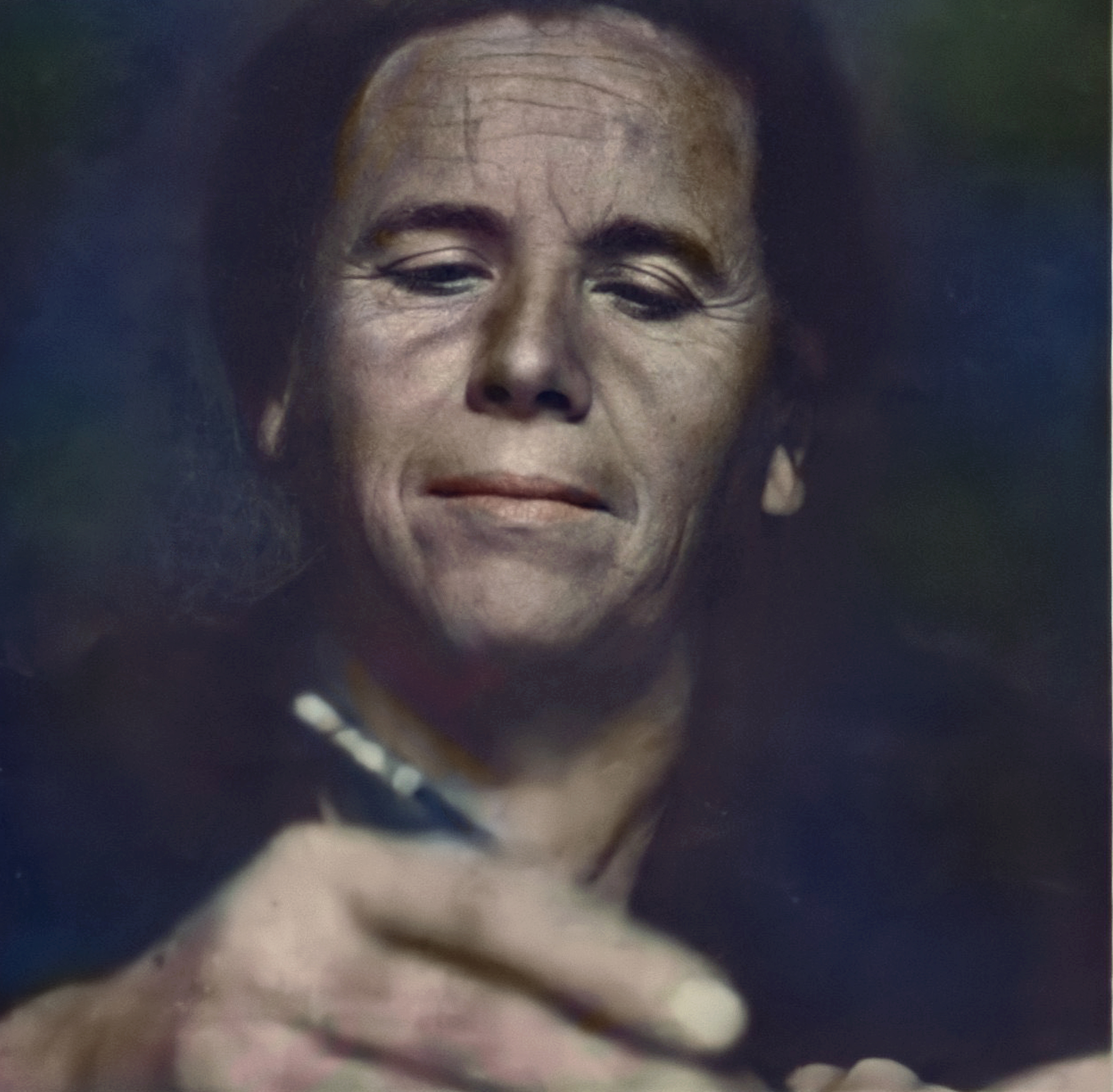
- María Domínguez Remón, Now Magazine, 10-27-1932
- Born: María Domínguez Remón; 1 April 1882; Pozuelo de Aragón, Spain
- Died: 7 September 1936 (aged 54); Fuendejalón, Spain
- Cause of death: Gunshot
- Other names: Imperia, María la tonta
- Occupations: Journalist, poet, politician
- Known for: First democratic mayor in Spain
- Political party: Socialist
- Spouses: Bonifacio Ba Cercé (separated 1907, widowed 1922); Arturo Segundo Romanos

María Domínguez Remón (1 April 1882 – 7 September 1936) was a Spanish journalist, poet, and republican socialist politician. In 1932, she was the first democratic mayor of the Second Spanish Republic in the town of Gallur, Zaragoza. She was shot by Francoists at the beginning of the Civil War.

== Early life ==
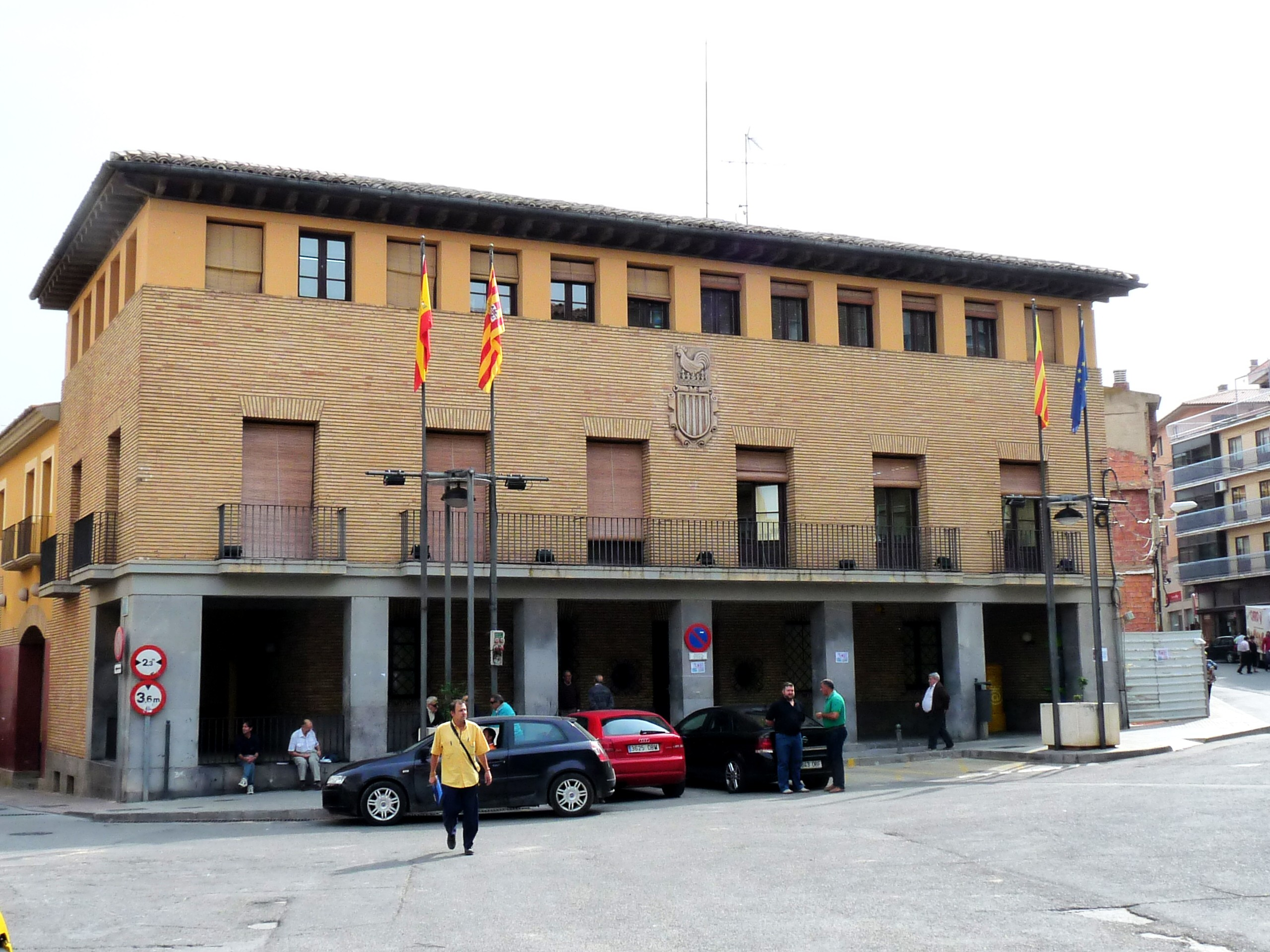
Town Hall of Gallur, Zaragoza

María Domínguez was the second daughter of a family of humble peasants. She could barely go to school for a few years, so she was largely self-educated.

A marriage to Bonifacio Ba Cercé was imposed upon her at age 18. Seven years later, tired of humiliation and ill-treatment, she fled home to Barcelona, where she worked as a maid.

Domínguez returned to Pozuelo de Aragón, and with the savings she had managed to put together she bought a machine to make hosiery, which allowed her to make a living.

== Journalistic and political career ==
In Pozuelo de Aragón, Domínguez began to write. Sent an article to the Madrid newspaper El País, which was published. She studied teaching, and took the exam in 1914, with a negative result. She settled in Zaragoza, enrolling in night classes at the School of Arts and Crafts while working to sew stockings at home.

Soon, Domínguez became an assiduous contributor to the republican weekly Ideal de Aragón, the organ of expression of the newly created Aragon Autonomous Republican Party, writing under the pseudonym Imperia. In 1917, she worked as an untitled teacher for a few months in a school in the hamlet of Mendiola in the Navarrese valley of Baztán, but had to leave because of health problems. However, she had time to take exams at the Teaching School of Pamplona, and was approved. She fell seriously ill from the 1918 flu pandemic, staying in bed for more than a year.

She worked as a maid in the house of the republican politician Venancio Sarría.

In 1922, she was widowed, and remarried to shearer Arturo Segundo Romanos in the church of San Gil de Zaragoza. She settled with her husband in Gallur. There, both participated in the constitution of the Unión General de Trabajadores (UGT) at the end of the dictatorship of Primo de Rivera.

Domínguez contributed to the Zaragoza socialist weekly Vida Nueva, whose first issue appeared on 4 May 1930. Beginning on 14 April 1931, she carried out an intense feminist, socialist, and republican propaganda campaign. In her writings she defended the Republic from "old politics", fought "the enemies of democracy", proclaimed the active role of women, and denounced recent injustices.

=== Mayor of Gallur (1932-33) ===
In July 1932, the Gallur city council chosen in the elections of April 1931 resigned in full due to popular pressure and the political conflicts facing the country.

The civil governor of the province appointed Domínguez chair of a management commission. She thus became the first woman to be in charge of a mayor's office. She occupied the position of mayor of Gallur from 29 July 1932 to 6 February 1933.

During her tenure, she applied the labor legislation of the Republic, created rural labor markets to reduce unemployment, established a unitary school for boys and girls, offered grants to teachers to hire cleaners so that the children did not have to clean, approved a grant for coal sacks so that children did not have to carry it home from school, and approved the renovation of schools to make them more dignified.

She attended the 17th Congress of the UGT in 1932, where she was secretary of the tenth session.

On 6 February 1933, Domínguez had to resign her position due to a law approved in the Congress that replaced the management commissions which had been created as a transitory measure. She left satisfied with her work, but disillusioned and tired of censorship of her efforts by the municipality.

=== Final years (1933-36) ===
After leaving office, she dedicated herself to teaching and journalistic collaborations. Her writings were militant and incisive, loaded with irony, intelligence, and a world view. She signed some articles with the pseudonym María la tonta (María the fool).

The values she defended were equality of women, freedom of thought, universal suffrage, the struggle against oppression, liberation from cultural and religious prejudices, education, culture as a driving force for change, courage, love not imposed but chosen freely, and the work of translating ideals into concrete actions.

In 1934, the progressive Editorial Castro of Madrid published the book Opiniones de mujeres (Opinions of Women), in which four of her lectures are collected: Feminismo, La mujer en el pasado, en el presente y en el porvenir, El socialismo y la mujer, and Costa y la República. The volume includes a prologue and a lecture by the lawyer and journalist Hildegart Rodríguez.

== Death ==
During the coup of 18 July 1936, Domínguez sought refuge at her sister's house in Pozuelo de Aragón. There she was arrested a few days later and shot by the pro-Franco side on 7 September 1936, in the walls of the cemetery of Fuendejalón, a nearby town. Her husband, Arturo Romanos, was shot shortly thereafter in the town of Tabuenca.

In February 2021, skeletal remains exhumed in the cemetery in Fuendejalón were confirmed to be those of Domínguez.

== Quotations ==
- "Only a constant labor of feminist propaganda could bring to fruition the project of achieving equality between the sexes."
- "Through the diffusion of culture at any level is possible the transformation of society."
- "I do not have to be a slave to anyone."
- "I consecrate my life to the Republic and I will not faint even when I suffer disappointments."

== Documentary ==
In January 2015, director Vicky Calavia released the documentary María Domínguez. La palabra libre, with the participation of Javier Barreiro, Arturo Cejudo, Julita Cifuentes, Javier Fernández, Herminio Lafoz, Pilar Maluenda, Rosa Montero, Rosa María Pérez, Alberto Sabio, and Mari Carmen Sánchez.

== Recognition ==
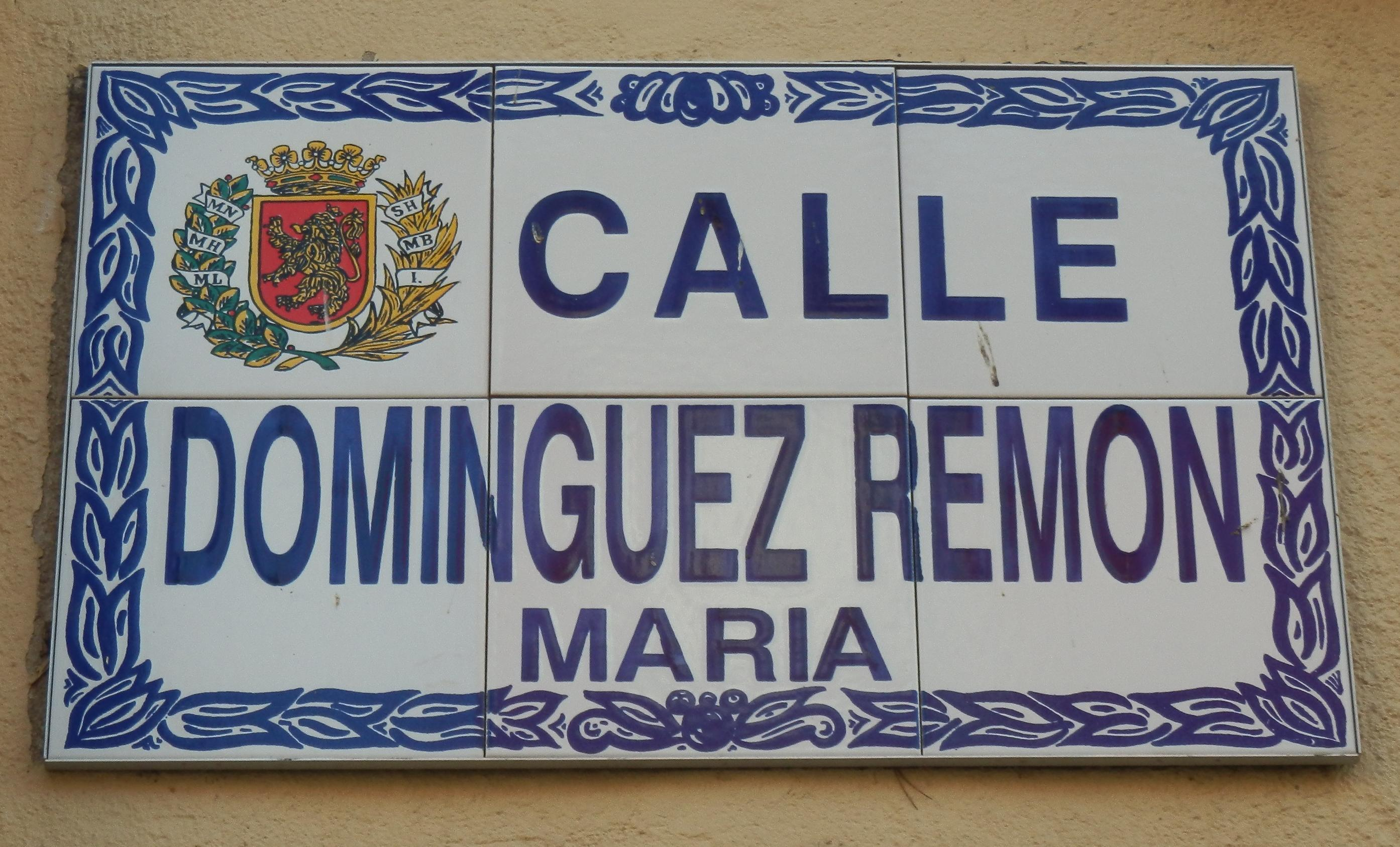
Street plaque of Zaragoza dedicated to María Domínguez Remón

In 1999, the Provincial Council of Zaragoza posthumously granted her the medal of Santa Isabel.

The city council of Zaragoza dedicated a street to her in the neighborhood of El Picarral which had previously been dedicated to Francoist general Monasterio.

The municipal school of Gallur and one of its streets also bear her name.

The María Domínguez Foundation of Zaragoza, of the Spanish Socialist Workers' Party, is dedicated to her.

In Gallur, the María Domínguez Women's Association promotes women and community service.
