= Campo de Borja (DO) =

Spanish wine producing area

Coordinates: 41°49′N 1°32′W

Campo de Borja DOP
- Wine region
- Campo de Borja DOP in the province of Zaragoza in the region of Aragon
- Official name: D.O.P Campo de Borja
- Type: Denominación de Origen Protegida (DOP)
- Year established: 1977
- Country: Spain
- No. of vineyards: 6,242 hectares (15,424 acres)
- No. of wineries: 18
- Wine produced: 248,509 hectolitres
- Comments: Data for 2016 / 2017

The 4 DOP wine regions in the region of Aragon, (Spain)

Campo de Borja is a Spanish Denominación de Origen Protegida (DOP) for wines located in the Campo de Borja comarca, northwest of the province of Zaragoza (Aragon, Spain). It is a transition zone between the plains of the River Ebro and the mountains of the Sistema Ibérico. The DOP comprises 16 municipalities. These are Ainzón, Agón, Albeta, Ambel, Bisimbre, Borja, Bulbuente, Bureta, Fréscano, Fuendejalón, Magallón, Maleján, Mallén, Pozuelo de Aragón, Tabuenca and Vera de Moncayo. The Moncayo mountain is the dominant feature of the DOP and creates a microclimate which gives the wines a special character.

== History ==
It is assumed that the ancient Romans introduced and developed grape-growing in this region, but the first written reference is a document in the archives of the Cistercian Monastery of Veruela which refers to donations of vineyards in the year 1203.

During the centuries of Arab domination of the Iberian Peninsula, grape and wine production decreased and only increased again after the reconquest by Christian forces.

During the course of the 15th century the successive abbots of the Veruela Monastery acquired vast quantities of land and placed it under vines. According to the monastery’s records, in 1453 they even bought an entire town (Ainzón) with all its fields, pastures, watercourses and vineyards.

This monastery was very influential in the development of wine production right up to the 19th century, and was responsible for the replanting and grafting of the entire area after the phylloxera plague. The area was finally recognised as a Denominación de Origin in 1980 when the statutes were approved.

== Climate ==
The climate is continental, with Atlantic influences during the winter, notably a cold, dry wind from the northwest. In summer, there is a Mediterranean influence. The temperature varies a great deal, both on a daily and on a seasonal basis. Annual rainfall is very low, only about 350 mm in the low-lying areas and 450 mm in higher areas. The vineyards are planted on a series of high plateaus at heights ranging between 350 m and 750 m above sea level.

== Soils ==
The soils are mainly dark lime-bearing soils, of average rockiness, good drainage, average level of organic matter and rich in nutrients. Closer to the Moncayo the clay and iron content increases, as does the general rockiness.

== Vineyards ==
There are currently about 6,300 ha under vines which produce between 20 and 25 million kg of grapes. The vines are cultivated both as low bushes (en vaso) and also on trellises (en espaldera).

== Authorised Grape varieties ==
The authorised grape varieties are:

- Red: Garnacha, Tempranillo, Mazuela, Cabernet Sauvignon, Merlot, Syrah
- White: Macabeo, Garnacha Blanca, Chardonnay, Moscatel de Alejandría, Sauvignon Blanc, and Verdejo

== Wines ==
- Whites: made with 100% Macabeo grapes. Min 11%
- Rosés: made with Garnacha grapes. Min 11%
- Young Reds: Made both as 100% Garnacha and also in combination with Tempranillo and Cabernet Sauvignon. Min 12%
- Crianzas: must be aged for at least 24 months. Min 12.5%
- Reservas: must be aged for at least 12 months in oak casks plus 24 months in the bottle. Min 12.5%
- Gran Reservas: must be aged for at least 24 months in oak casks plus 36 months in the bottle. Min 12.5%
- Others: Mistelas, dessert wines form Moscatel and sparkling wine is also produced. Min 15%
