= Ambel =

Ambel may refer to:

- Ambel, Zaragoza, a municipality located in Aragon, Spain
- Ambel, Isère, a commune in the Auvergne-Rhône-Alpes region of southeastern France
- Ambel language, or Waigeo, a language of eastern Indonesia
- Eric Ambel (born 1957), American musician
