= Axivil =

Spanish early music group founded 1997

Axivil are a Spanish early music group founded 1997, and directed by Felipe Sánchez Mascuñano. The ensemble takes its name from the Jewish vihuela de péñola player Juceff Axivil (fl. 1352), the surname Axivil being an Arabized version of Sevillano, hence "Joseph of Seville," although in fact from Borja.

== Discography ==
- AXIVIL Criollo - En una salón de La Habana (Habaneras y contradanzas, 1830-1855). RTVE-Música (2000)
- AXIVIL Goyesco - La Seguidilla Galante. Canciones líricas 1800-1830. Pilar Jurado. RTVE Música (2004)
- AXIVIL Goyesco - La música en tiempos del Motín de Aranjuez Música Antigua Aranjuez (2005)
- AXIVIL Castizo - Sarao Barroco (Tonos del siglo XVII) Música Antigua Aranjuez (2005)
- AXIVIL Aljamía - Perfume Mudejar with flamenco singer Pedro Sanz. Pneuma (2008)
