= Bisimbre =

- municipality
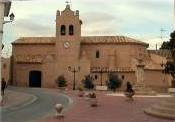

- Flag Coat of arms

- Location in Spain. Bisimbre (Spain) Bisimbre (Europe)
- Coordinates: 41°51′22.85″N 1°26′35.15″W
- Country: Spain
- Autonomous community: Aragon
- Province: Zaragoza
- Comarca: Campo de Borja

Area
  - Total: 11.16 km^{2} (4.31 sq mi)

Population (2025-01-01)
  - Total: 98
  - Density: 8.8/km^{2} (23/sq mi)
- Demonym: Bisimbreros
- Time zone: UTC+1 (CET)
  - Summer (DST): UTC+2 (CEST)
- Website: Official website

Bisimbre is a municipality located in the province of Zaragoza, Aragon, Spain.

== See also ==
- List of municipalities in Zaragoza
