= Mianos =

Coordinates: 42°35′N 0°56′W

Mianos (Spanish) Mians (Aragonese)
- municipality
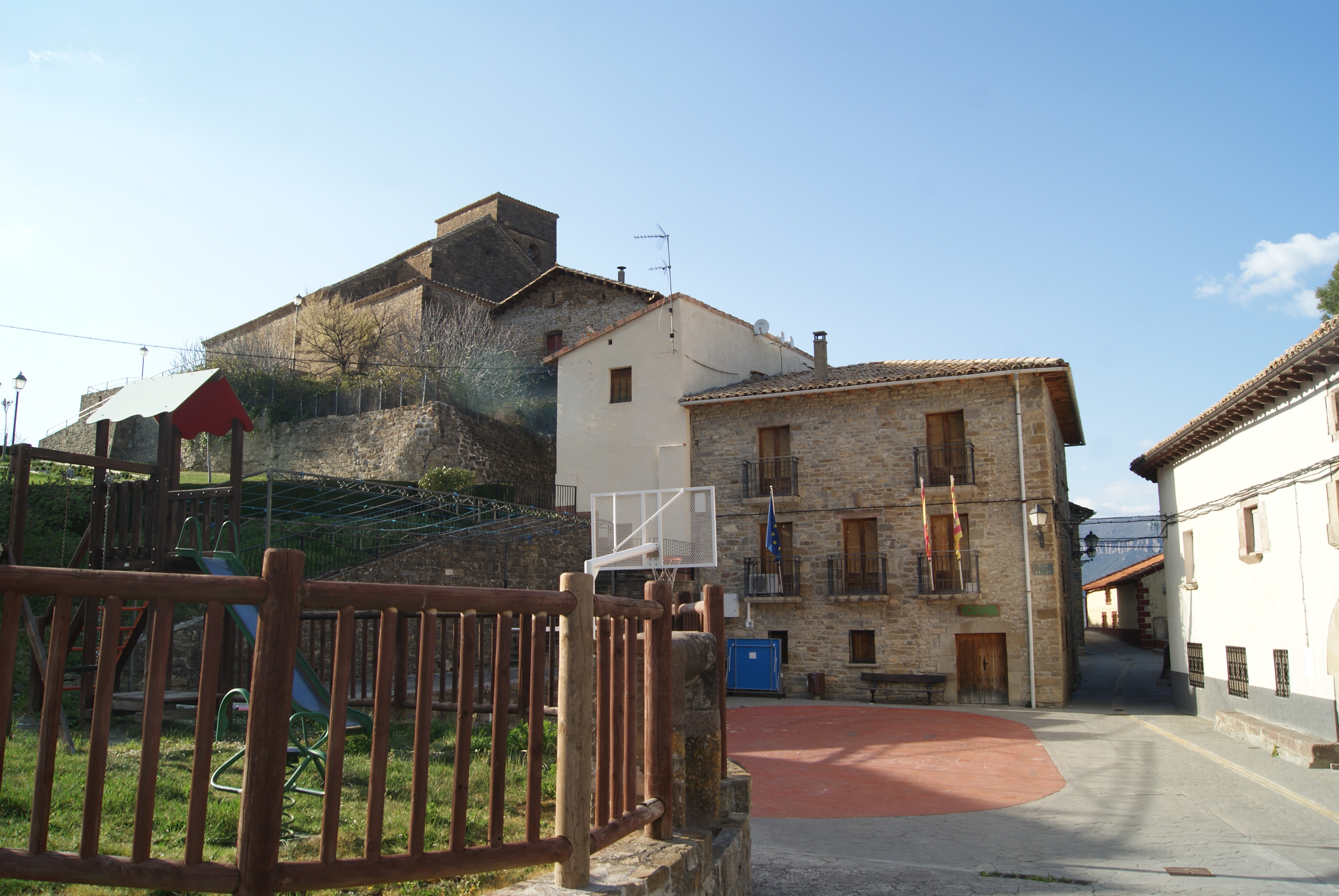
- Street of Mianos, Zaragoza, Spain
- Interactive map of Mianos (Spanish)
- Country: Spain
- Autonomous community: Aragon
- Province: Zaragoza

Area
  - Total: 14 km^{2} (5.4 sq mi)

Population (2025-01-01)
  - Total: 25
  - Density: 1.8/km^{2} (4.6/sq mi)
- Time zone: UTC+1 (CET)
  - Summer (DST): UTC+2 (CEST)

Mianos (in Aragonese: both Mians) is a municipality located in the province of Zaragoza, Aragon, Spain. According to the 2025 census (INE), the municipality has a population of 25 inhabitants.

== See also ==
- List of municipalities in Zaragoza
