= Mozota =

Mozota, Spain
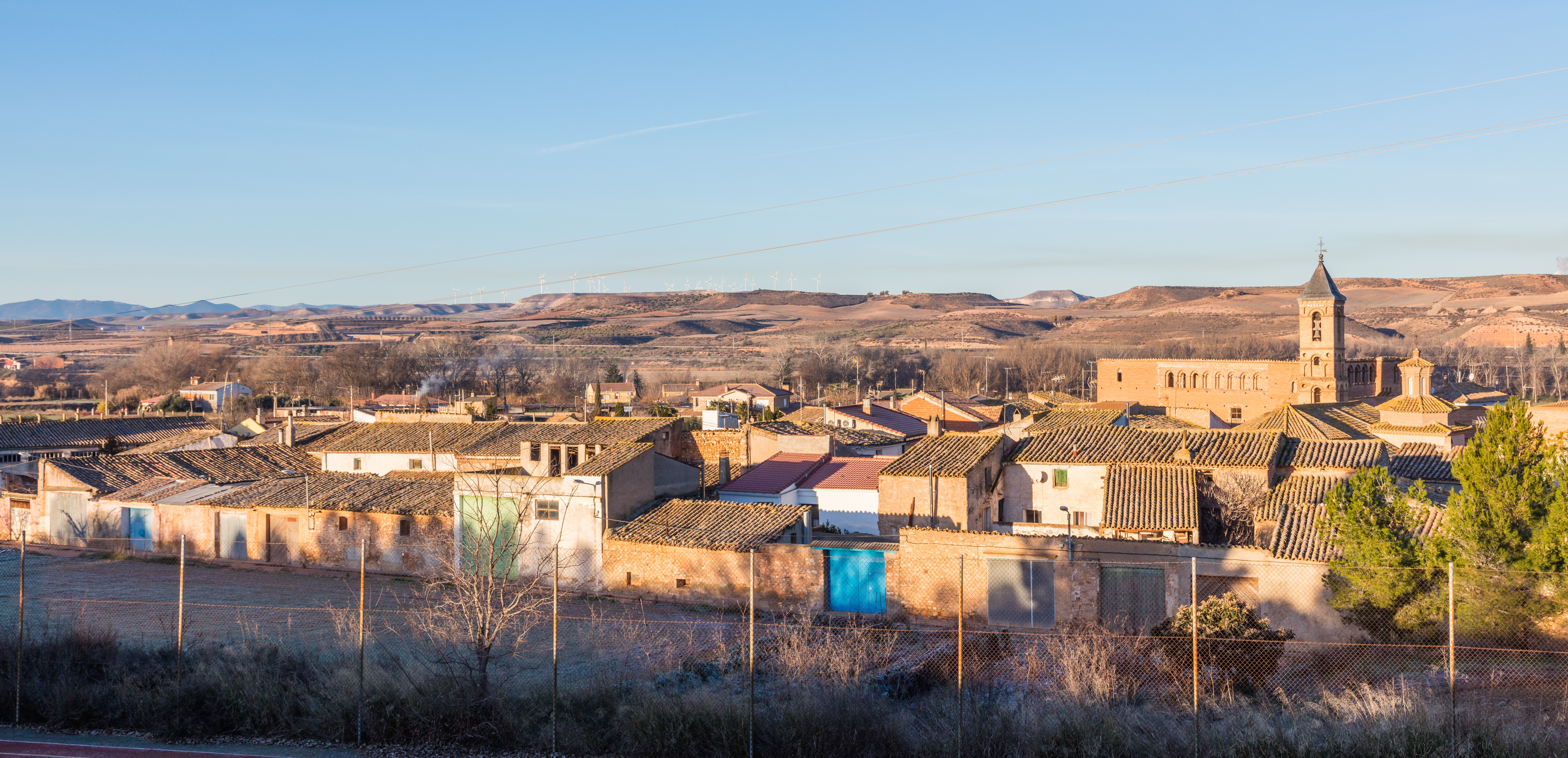

- Flag Coat of arms

- Location within Aragon Location within Spain Location within Europe
- Country: Spain
- Autonomous community: Aragon
- Province: Zaragoza
- Municipality: Mozota

Area
  - Total: 8.68 km^{2} (3.35 sq mi)

Population (2025-01-01)
  - Total: 130
  - Density: 15/km^{2} (39/sq mi)
- Time zone: UTC+1 (CET)
  - Summer (DST): UTC+2 (CEST)

Mozota is a small town and municipality in Zaragoza province 25 km southwest of Zaragoza, Aragon, Spain.

== The municipality ==
The municipality of Mozota is only 8.7 km^{2} in area and located in the south-west of Zaragoza district (comarca).

A wine growing region since Roman times (Zaragoza derives from Caesar Augustus), the whole area is dominated by vines. Traditional grape varieties of the area are Grenache (80%), Tempranillo (15%) and Carignane (5%), producing full-bodied, high-strength tintos that are widely distributed for blending.

== The town ==
The town itself only contains about 115 people. It sits on the Rio Huerva on routes south to Madrid and Valencia. It also lies in the lee of the Moncayo mountain range near the Campo de Carineña wine-growing region of Spain.

Many small agrarian communities, like Mozota town, have benefited from the Spanish Government's policy of preserving its heritage. Places of interest include the fortified manor house and battlements, the 12th-century castle, the parish church of Saint Mary Magdalen and the fortified palace.

== See also ==
- List of municipalities in Zaragoza
