= Province of Zaragoza =

Province of Spain

Province of Zaragoza: Provincia de Zaragoza (Spanish); Província de Saragossa (Catalan)
- Province
- Flag Coat of arms

- Map of the Province of Zaragoza in Spain
- Coordinates: 41°35′N 1°00′W
- Country: Spain
- Autonomous community: Aragon
- Capital: Zaragoza
- Municipalities: 293

Area
  - Total: 17,275.06 km^{2} (6,669.94 sq mi)
  - Rank: 4th in Spain
- 3.4% of Spain

Population (2025)
  - Total: 998,443
  - Rank: 15th in Spain
  - Density: 57.7968/km^{2} (149.693/sq mi)
- 2.0% of Spain
- Demonym(s): Zaragozano/Zaragozana, Saragossà/Saragossana
- Time zone: UTC+1 (CET)
  - Summer (DST): UTC+2 (CEST)
- Spoken language(s): Spanish, Catalan
- Parliament: Cortes Generales

The Province of Zaragoza (Spanish: Provincia de Zaragoza [θaɾaˈɣoθa])(Catalan: Província de Saragossa), also called Saragossa in English, is a province of northern Spain, in the central part of the autonomous community of Aragon. Its capital is the city of Zaragoza, which is also the capital of the autonomous community. Other towns in the province include La Almunia de Doña Godina, Borja, Calatayud, Caspe, Ejea de los Caballeros, Tarazona, Mequinenza, Cariñena and Utebo.

The province's area is 17,275.06 square kilometres (6,669.94 sq mi), which makes it the 4th-largest Spanish province by land area. Its population is 998,443, accounting for 73% of the entire population of Aragon, and 70% of the province lived in the capital. It contains 293 municipalities, of which more than half are villages with fewer than 300 inhabitants.

The main language throughout the province is Spanish (with official status), although Catalan is spoken in the easternmost part (Bajo Aragón-Caspe comarca and Mequinenza municipality).

== Geography ==
The province of Zaragoza is bordered by the provinces of Lleida, Tarragona, Teruel, Guadalajara, Soria, La Rioja, Navarre, and Huesca. The southern and western side of the province is in the mountainous Sistema Ibérico area and includes its highest point, the Moncayo, while the northern end reaches the Pre-Pyrenees. The Ebro River crosses the province from west to east.

== Comarcas ==
Comarcas in the Zaragoza province:

No.	Name	Capital
5	Cinco Villas	Ejea de los Caballeros
12	Tarazona y el Moncayo	Tarazona
13	Campo de Borja	Borja
14	Aranda	Illueca
15	Ribera Alta del Ebro	Alagón
16	Valdejalón	La Almunia de Doña Godina
17	Zaragoza	Zaragoza
18	Ribera Baja del Ebro	Quinto
19	Bajo Aragón-Caspe/Baix Aragó-Casp	Caspe
20	Comunidad de Calatayud	Calatayud
21	Campo de Cariñena	Cariñena
22	Campo de Belchite	Belchite
24	Campo de Daroca	Daroca

The following comarcas having their capital in Huesca Province include municipal terms within Zaragoza Province:

- Bajo Cinca: Mequinenza.
- Hoya de Huesca: Murillo de Gállego and Santa Eulalia de Gállego.
- Jacetania: Artieda, Mianos, Salvatierra de Esca and Sigüés.
- Monegros: La Almolda, Bujaraloz, Farlete, Leciñena, Monegrillo and Perdiguera.

== Municipalities ==
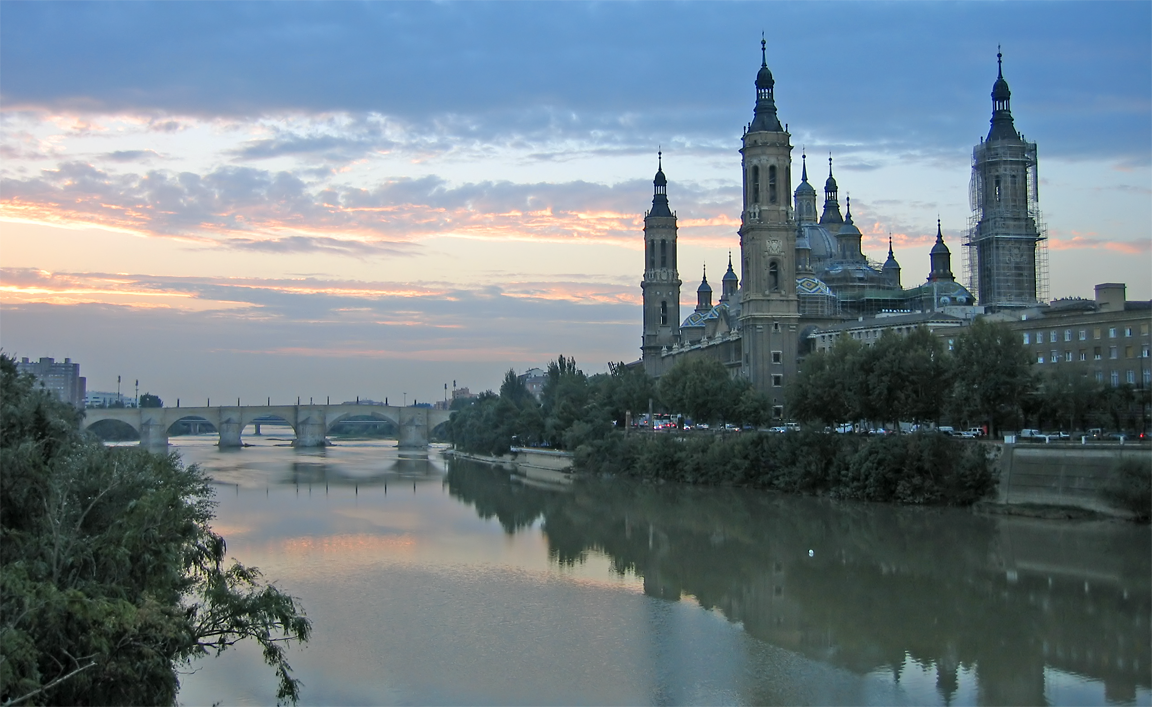
The Ebro River in the City of Zaragoza with the Basilica of Our Lady of the Pillar on the right

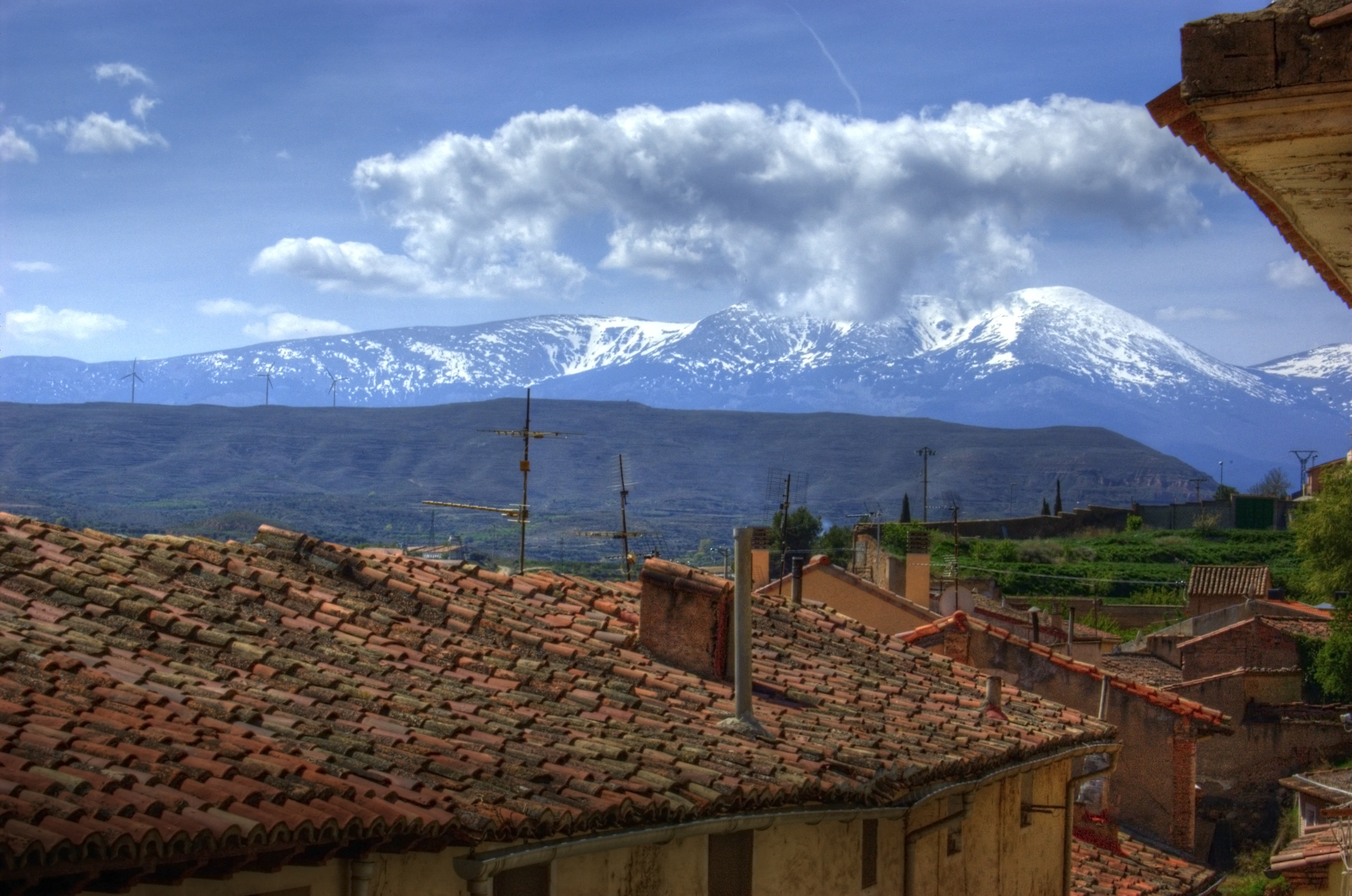
The Moncayo Massif seen from Tarazona

The province has 293 municipalities:

- Abanto
- Acered
- Agón
- Aguarón
- Aguilón
- Ainzón
- Aladrén
- Alagón
- Alarba
- Alberite de San Juan
- Albeta
- Alborge
- Alcalá de Ebro
- Alcalá de Moncayo
- Alconchel de Ariza
- Aldehuela de Liestos
- Alfajarín
- Alfamén
- Alforque
- Alhama de Aragón
- Almochuel
- La Almolda
- Almonacid de la Cuba
- Almonacid de la Sierra
- La Almunia de Doña Godina
- Alpartir
- Ambel
- Anento
- Aniñón
- Añón de Moncayo
- Aranda de Moncayo
- Arándiga
- Ardisa
- Ariza
- Artieda
- Asín
- Atea
- Ateca
- Azuara
- Badules
- Bagüés
- Balconchán
- Bárboles
- Bardallur
- Belchite
- Belmonte de Gracián
- Berdejo
- Berrueco
- Biel
- Bijuesca
- Biota
- Bisimbre
- Boquiñeni
- Bordalba
- Borja
- Botorrita
- Brea de Aragón
- Bubierca
- Bujaraloz
- Bulbuente
- Bureta
- El Burgo de Ebro
- El Buste
- Cabañas de Ebro
- Cabolafuente
- Cadrete
- Calatayud
- Calatorao
- Calcena
- Calmarza
- Campillo de Aragón
- Carenas
- Cariñena
- Caspe
- Castejón de Alarba
- Castejón de las Armas
- Castejón de Valdejasa
- Castiliscar
- Cervera de la Cañada
- Cerveruela
- Cetina
- Chiprana
- Chodes
- Cimballa
- Cinco Olivas
- Clarés de Ribota
- Codo
- Codos
- Contamina
- Cosuenda
- Cuarte de Huerva
- Cubel
- Las Cuerlas
- Daroca
- Ejea de los Caballeros
- Embid de Ariza
- Encinacorba
- Épila
- Erla
- Escatrón
- Fabara
- Farlete
- Fayón
- Los Fayos
- Figueruelas
- Fombuena
- El Frago
- El Frasno
- Fréscano
- Fuendejalón
- Fuendetodos
- Fuentes de Ebro
- Fuentes de Jiloca
- Gallocanta
- Gallur
- Gelsa
- Godojos
- Gotor
- Grisel
- Grisén
- Herrera de los Navarros
- Ibdes
- Illueca
- Isuerre
- Jaraba
- Jarque
- Jaulín
- La Joyosa
- Lagata
- Langa del Castillo
- Layana
- Lécera
- Lechón
- Leciñena
- Letux
- Litago
- Lituénigo
- Lobera de Onsella
- Longares
- Longás
- Lucena de Jalón
- Luceni
- Luesia
- Luesma
- Lumpiaque
- Luna
- Maella
- Magallón
- Mainar
- Malanquilla
- Maleján
- Mallén
- Malón
- Maluenda
- Manchones
- Mara
- María de Huerva
- Marracos
- Mediana de Aragón
- Mequinenza
- Mesones de Isuela
- Mezalocha
- Mianos
- Miedes de Aragón
- Monegrillo
- Moneva
- Monreal de Ariza
- Monterde
- Montón
- Morata de Jalón
- Morata de Jiloca
- Morés
- Moros
- Moyuela
- Mozota
- Muel
- La Muela
- Munébrega
- Murero
- Murillo de Gállego
- Navardún
- Nigüella
- Nombrevilla
- Nonaspe
- Novallas
- Novillas
- Nuévalos
- Nuez de Ebro
- Olvés
- Orcajo
- Orera
- Orés
- Oseja
- Osera de Ebro
- Paniza
- Paracuellos de Jiloca
- Paracuellos de la Ribera
- Pastriz
- Pedrola
- Las Pedrosas
- Perdiguera
- Piedratajada
- Pina de Ebro
- Pinseque
- Los Pintanos
- Plasencia de Jalón
- Pleitas
- Plenas
- Pomer
- Pozuel de Ariza
- Pozuelo de Aragón
- Pradilla de Ebro
- Puebla de Albortón
- La Puebla de Alfindén
- Puendeluna
- Purujosa
- Quinto
- Remolinos
- Retascón
- Ricla
- Romanos
- Rueda de Jalón
- Ruesca
- Sabiñán
- Sádaba
- Salillas de Jalón
- Salvatierra de Esca
- Samper del Salz
- San Martín de la Virgen de Moncayo
- San Mateo de Gállego
- Santa Cruz de Grío
- Santa Cruz de Moncayo
- Santa Eulalia de Gállego
- Santed
- Sástago
- Sediles
- Sestrica
- Sierra de Luna
- Sigüés
- Sisamón
- Sobradiel
- Sos del Rey Católico
- Tabuenca
- Talamantes
- Tarazona
- Tauste
- Terrer
- Tierga
- Tobed
- Torralba de los Frailes
- Torralba de Ribota
- Torralbilla
- Torrehermosa
- Torrelapaja
- Torrellas
- Torres de Berrellén
- Torrijo de la Cañada
- Tosos
- Trasmoz
- Trasobares
- Uncastillo
- Undués de Lerda
- Urrea de Jalón
- Urriés
- Used
- Utebo
- Val de San Martín
- Valdehorna
- Valmadrid
- Valpalmas
- Valtorres
- Velilla de Ebro
- Velilla de Jiloca
- Vera de Moncayo
- Vierlas
- Villadoz
- Villafeliche
- Villafranca de Ebro
- Villalba de Perejil
- Villalengua
- Villamayor de Gállego
- Villanueva de Gállego
- Villanueva de Huerva
- Villanueva de Jiloca
- Villar de los Navarros
- Villarreal de Huerva
- Villarroya de la Sierra
- Villarroya del Campo
- La Vilueña
- Vistabella de Huerva
- La Zaida
- Zaragoza
- Zuera

== Demographics ==
As of 2026, the population is 998,443, of which 49.1% are male, and 50.9% are female. Minors make up 16.1% of the population, and seniors make up 22.2%.

Historical population

Year	Pop.	±%
1842	231,609	—
1857	384,176	+65.9%
1877	402,614	+4.8%
1887	415,152	+3.1%
1900	421,023	+1.4%
1910	449,501	+6.8%
1920	498,590	+10.9%
1930	530,127	+6.3%
1940	574,566	+8.4%

Year	Pop.	±%
1950	609,393	+6.1%
1960	641,115	+5.2%
1970	757,433	+18.1%
1981	828,588	+9.4%
1991	837,327	+1.1%
2001	861,855	+2.9%
2011	975,385	+13.2%
2021	973,684	−0.2%

Source: INE

=== Immigration ===
As of 2025, immigrants make up 19.0% of the population. The 5 largest foreign countries of birth are Romania, Colombia, Morocco, Nicaragua, and Ecuador.

== See also ==
- List of municipalities in Zaragoza
