= Talamantes =

Coordinates: 41°44′N 1°41′W

- municipality
- Flag Coat of arms
- Interactive map of Talamantes
- Country: Spain
- Autonomous community: Aragon
- Province: Zaragoza

Area
  - Total: 47 km^{2} (18 sq mi)

Population (2025-01-01)
  - Total: 68
  - Density: 1.4/km^{2} (3.7/sq mi)
- Time zone: UTC+1 (CET)
  - Summer (DST): UTC+2 (CEST)

Talamantes is a municipality located in the province of Zaragoza, Aragon, Spain. According to the 2004 census (INE), the municipality has a population of 65 inhabitants.

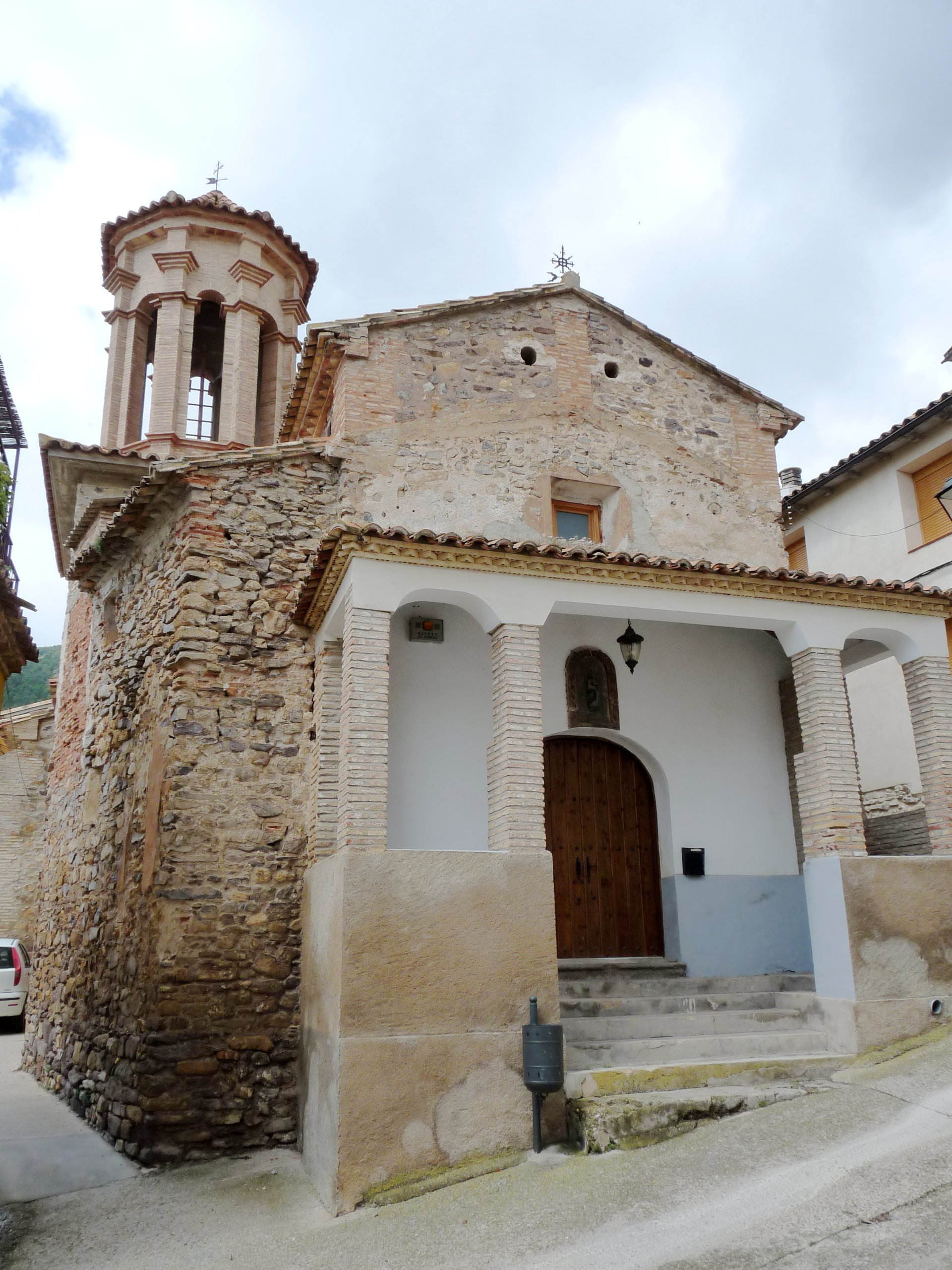
Church of San Pedro Apostol in Talamantes

== See also ==
- List of municipalities in Zaragoza
