= Fuendejalón =

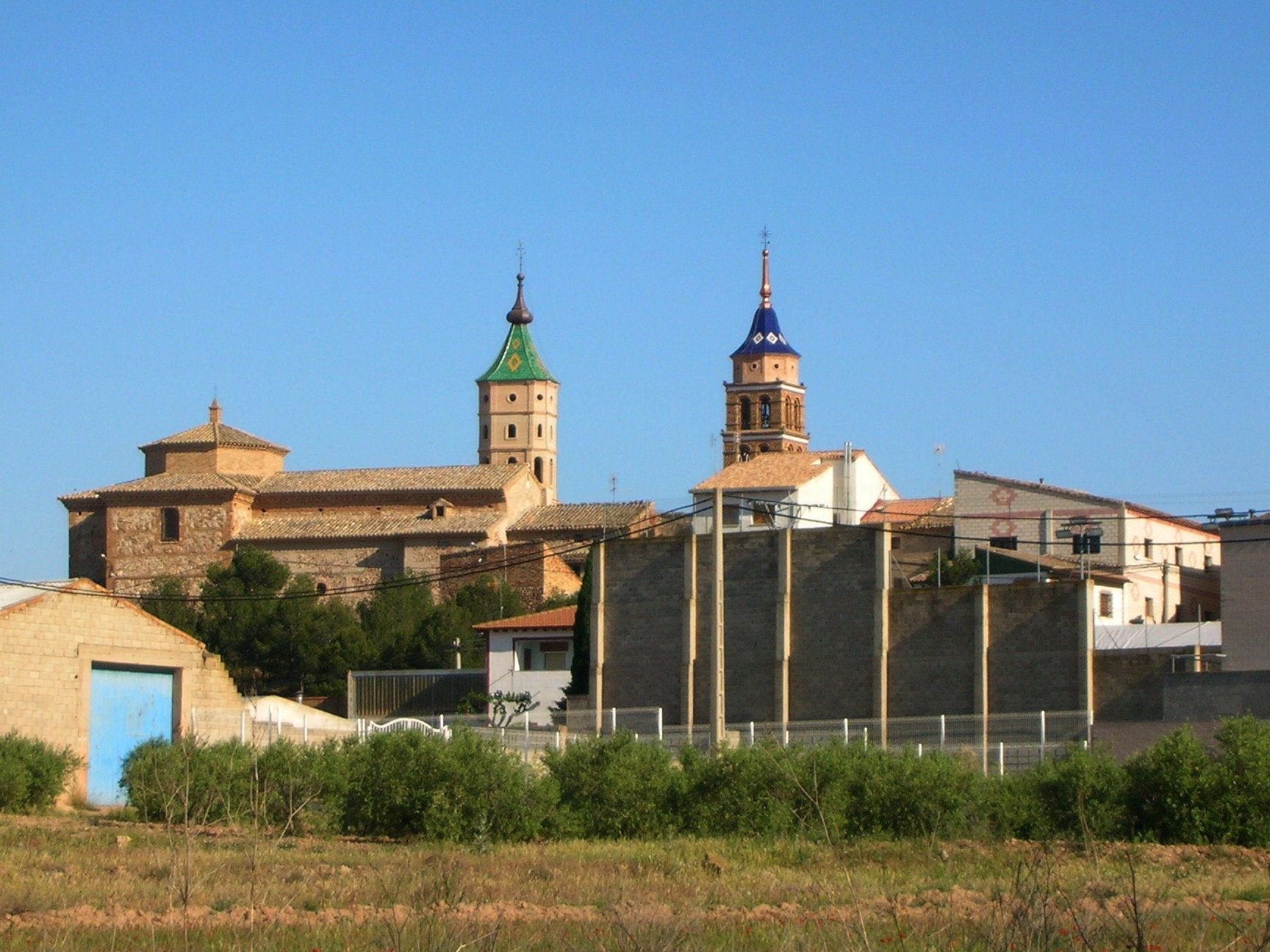
- The two bell towers of Fuendejalon seen from the north

- Flag Coat of arms

- Location within Aragon Location within Spain Location within Europe
- Country: Spain
- Autonomous community: Aragon
- Province: Zaragoza
- Comarca: Campo de Borja

Area
  - Total: 75 km^{2} (29 sq mi)

Population (2025-01-01)
  - Total: 774
  - Density: 10/km^{2} (27/sq mi)
- Time zone: UTC+1 (CET)
  - Summer (DST): UTC+2 (CEST)

Fuendejalón (Aragonese: Fuent de Xalón) is a municipality located in the province of Zaragoza, Aragon, Spain. According to the 2010 census the municipality has a population of 953 inhabitants.

The Sierra del Bollón range rises west of the town.

== See also ==
- Campo de Borja
- List of municipalities in Zaragoza
