= Magallón =

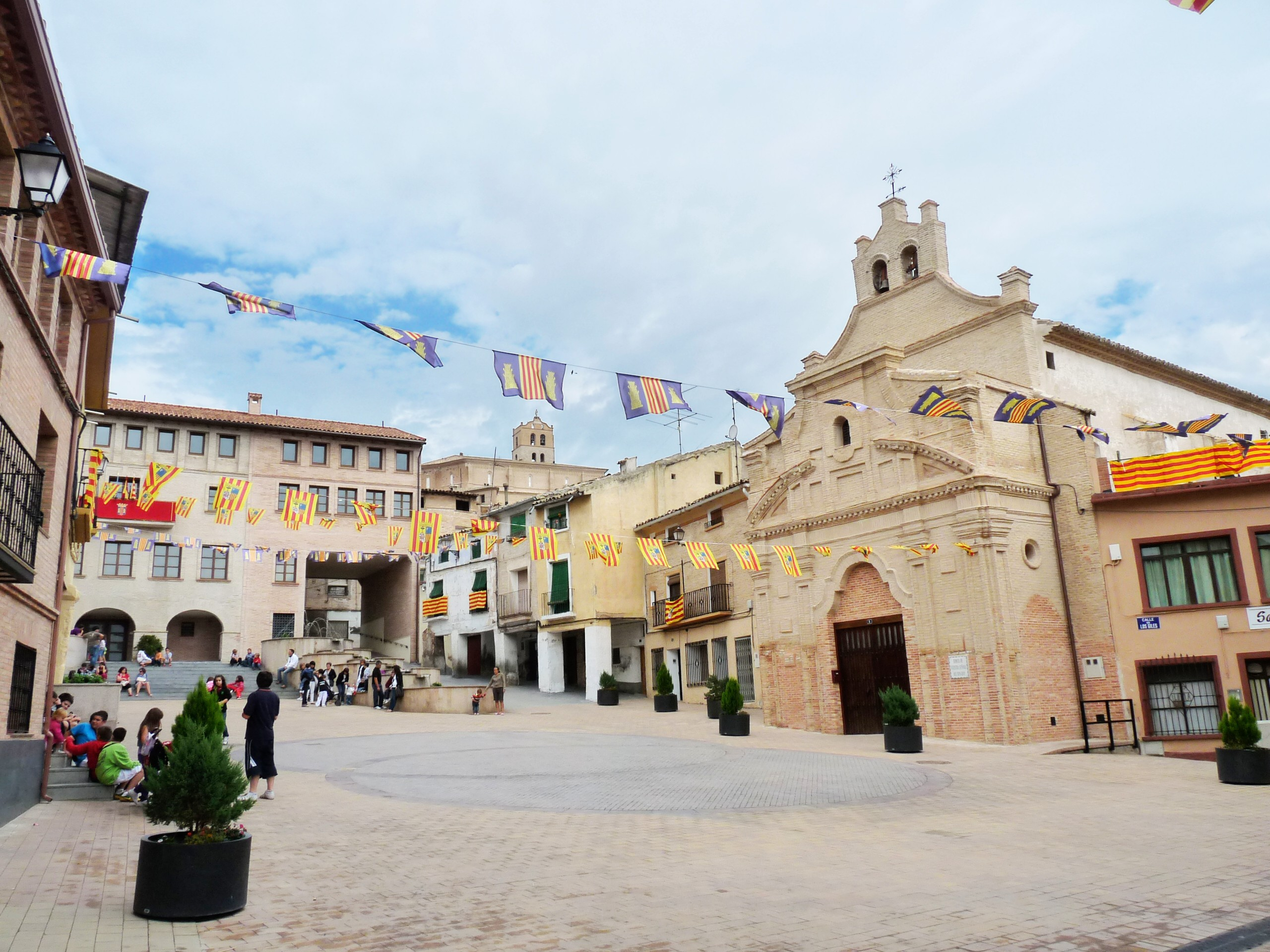

- Flag Coat of arms
- Interactive map of Magallón
- Coordinates: 41°50′10.32″N 1°27′36.72″W
- Country: Spain
- Autonomous community: Aragon
- Province: Zaragoza
- Comarca: Campo de Borja

Government
  - Mayor: Esteban Lagota Lázaro

Area
  - Total: 78 km^{2} (30 sq mi)
- Elevation: 419 m (1,375 ft)

Population (2025-01-01)
  - Total: 1,108
  - Density: 14/km^{2} (37/sq mi)
- Demonym(s): magallonero (co-ed and m), -a (f)
- Time zone: UTC+1 (CET)
  - Summer (DST): UTC+2 (CEST)
- Postal code: 50520
- Website: Official website

Magallón is a Spanish municipality, in the province of Zaragoza, autonomous community of Aragon. It has an area of 78.61 km^{2}, with a population of 1221 inhabitants (INE 2008) and a density of 15.53 inhab/km^{2}.

El Camino de Santiago de Soria (in English: The Way to Santiago of Soria), also called Castilian-Aragonese, passes through the town.

== Main sights ==
- Castle
- Church of Santa María de la Huerta
- Convent of the Dominicans
- Church of St. Lawrence, finished in 1609
- Hermitage of Nuestra Señora del Rosario
- Fornoles bridge over the Huecha river, of Roman origins
- Juanjo Bona

== See also ==
- List of municipalities in Zaragoza
