= Pozuelo de Aragón =

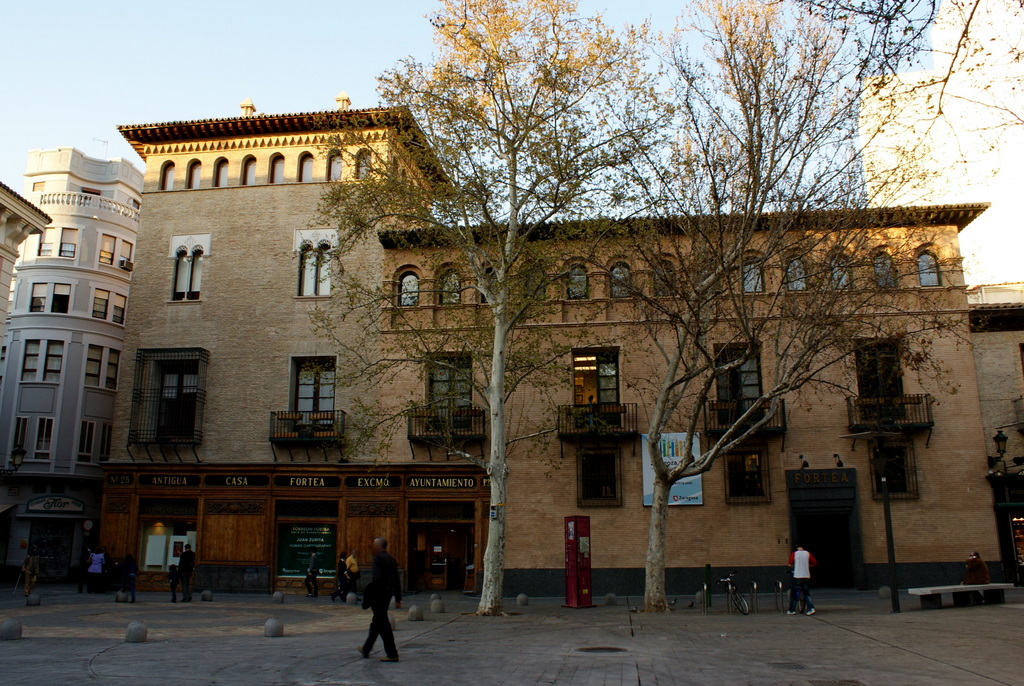
- Town hall

- Flag Coat of arms

- Location in Spain.
- Coordinates: 41°46′14.88″N 1°25′25.68″W
- Country: Spain
- Autonomous community: Aragon
- Province: Zaragoza
- Comarca: Campo de Borja

Government
  - Mayor: Jose J. Gracia

Area
  - Total: 32 km^{2} (12 sq mi)
- Elevation: 412 m (1,352 ft)

Population (2025-01-01)
  - Total: 247
  - Density: 7.7/km^{2} (20/sq mi)
- Demonym: Pozuelanos
- Time zone: UTC+1 (CET)
  - Summer (DST): UTC+2 (CEST)

Pozuelo de Aragón is a municipality located in the province of Zaragoza, Aragon, Spain.

== See also ==
- List of municipalities in Zaragoza
