= Novillas =

- municipality
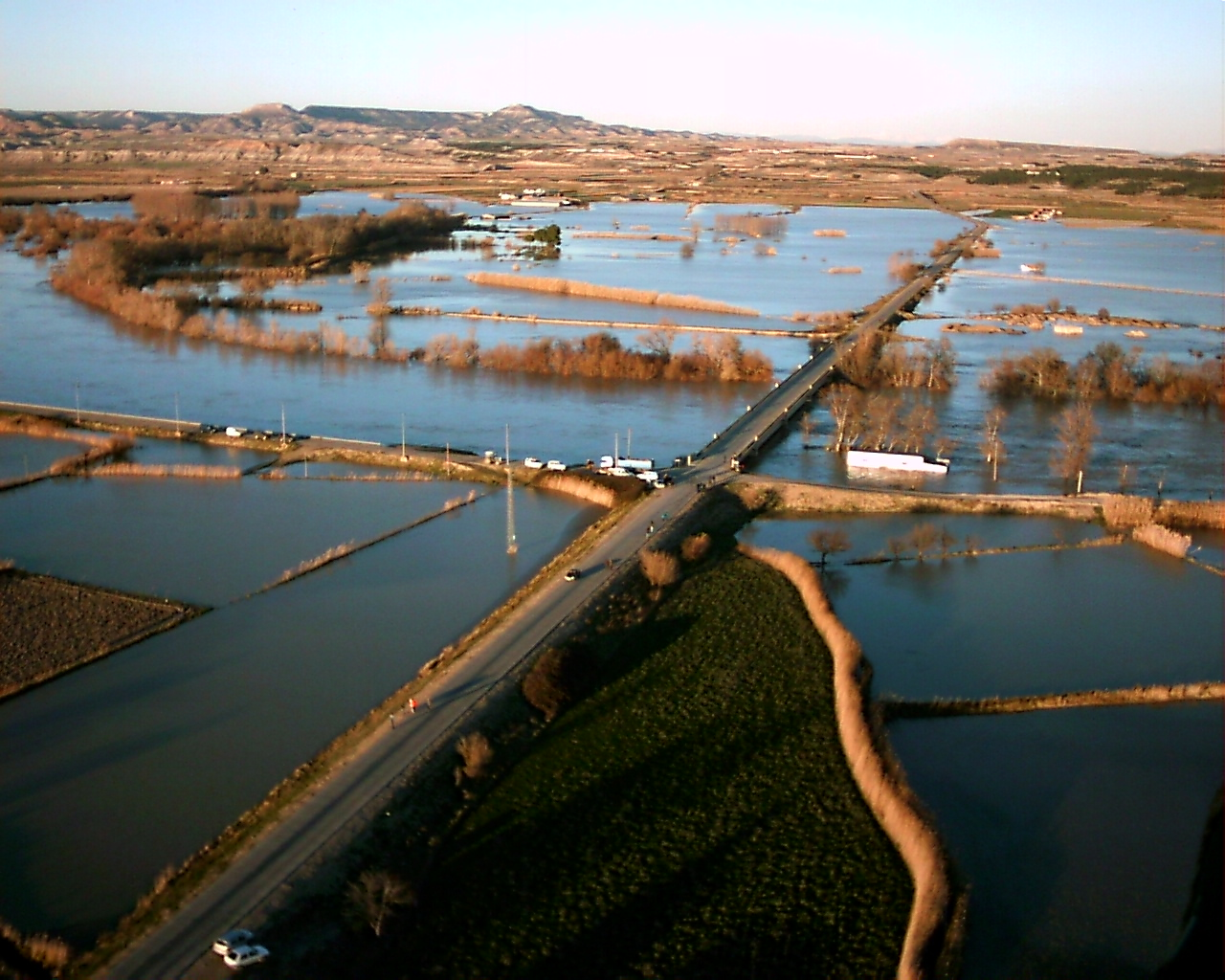

- Flag Coat of arms

- Location of Novillas within Aragon Novillas (Spain) Novillas (Europe)
- Coordinates: 41°55′59″N 1°23′40″W
- Country: Spain
- Autonomous community: Aragon
- Province: Zaragoza
- Municipality: Novillas

Area
  - Total: 25 km^{2} (9.7 sq mi)

Population (2025-01-01)
  - Total: 508
  - Density: 20/km^{2} (53/sq mi)
- Time zone: UTC+1 (CET)
  - Summer (DST): UTC+2 (CEST)

Novillas is a municipality located in the province of Zaragoza, Aragon, Spain. According to the 2004 census (INE), the municipality has a population of 667 inhabitants.

In the 12the century, the Grand Master of the Knights Templar Arnold of Torroja organized a group of intellectuals who wrote the Cartulary of Knights Templar of the Preceptory of Novillas, a collection of 444 manuscripts describing the corporative identity, the rights and the properties of the order in a tensioned area of border across the three main kingdoms of Spain (Aragon, Castile and Pamplona). In the former islamic Valley of the middle Ebro, the Templar's area of influence developed around the encomienda of Novillas.

== See also ==
- List of municipalities in Zaragoza
