= Maleján =

Coordinates: 41°49′45″N 1°32′54″W

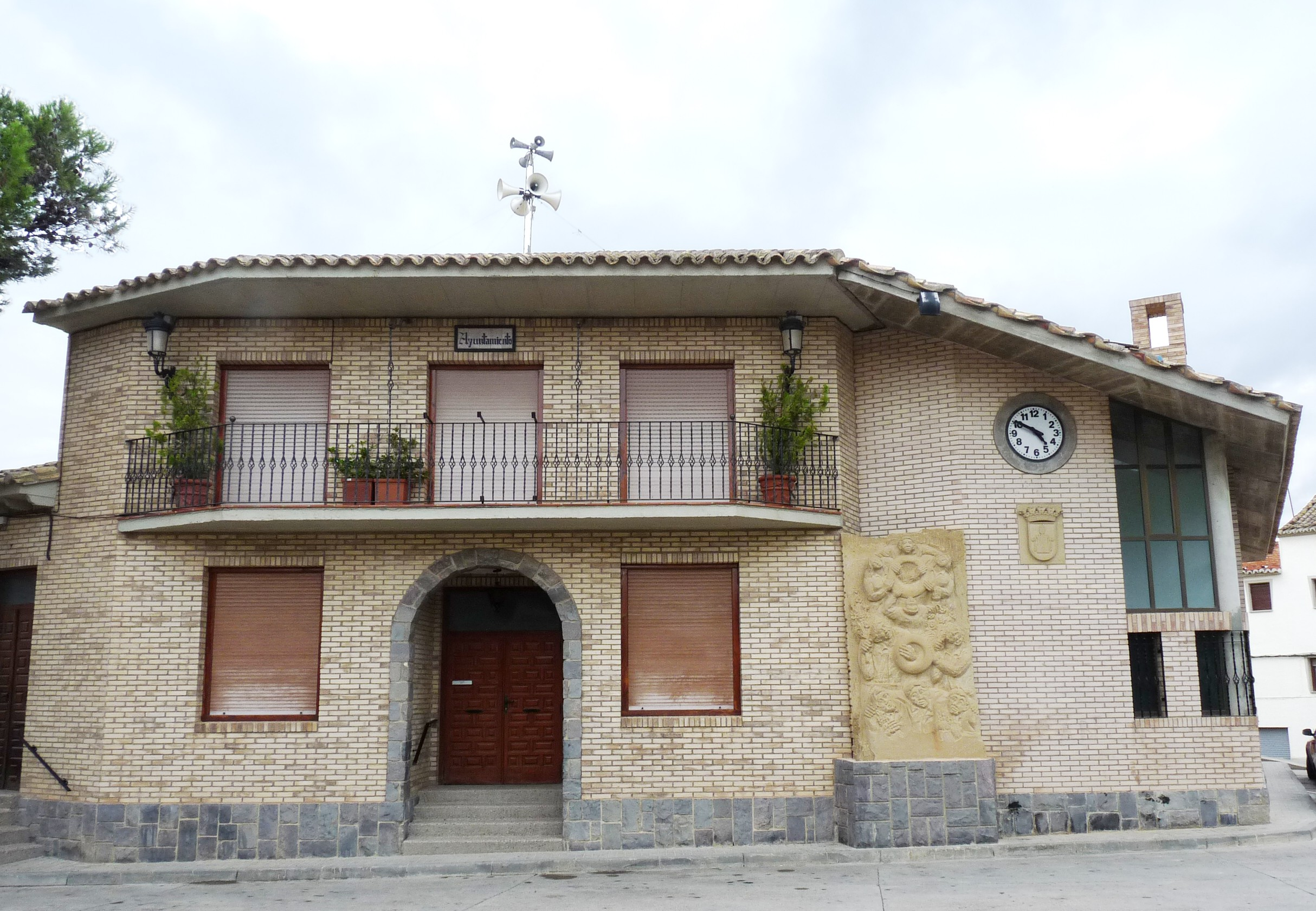
- Town hall of Maleján

- Flag Coat of arms
- Interactive map of Maleján
- Country: Spain
- Autonomous community: Aragon
- Province: Zaragoza
- Comarca: Campo de Borja

Area
  - Total: 2.8 km^{2} (1.1 sq mi)
- Elevation: 472 m (1,549 ft)

Population (2025-01-01)
  - Total: 282
- Time zone: UTC+1 (CET)
  - Summer (DST): UTC+2 (CEST)

Maleján is a municipality located in the province of Zaragoza, Aragon, Spain. According to the 2010 census (INE), the municipality has a population of 344 inhabitants.

== See also ==
- Campo de Borja
- List of municipalities in Zaragoza
