= Agón =

- municipality
- Flag Coat of arms

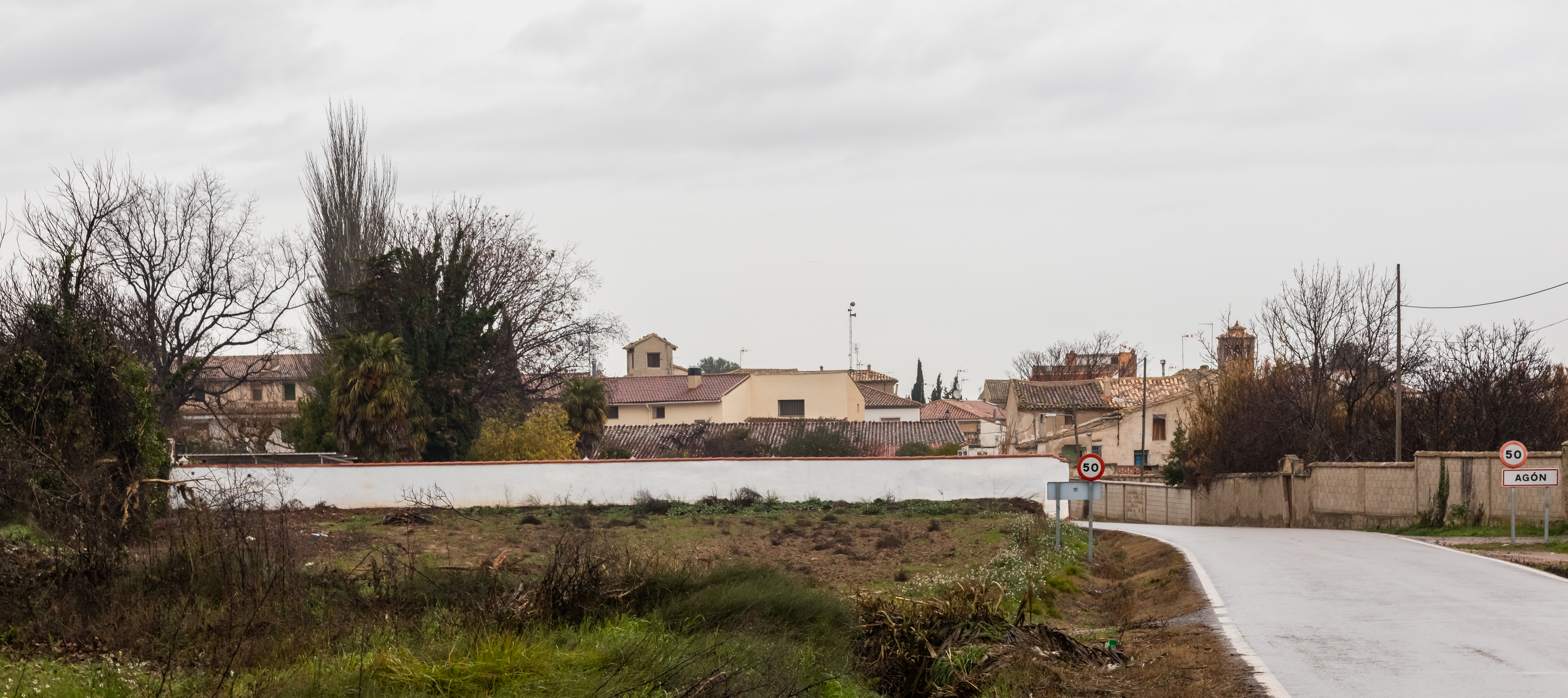

- Location within Aragon Location within Spain Location within Europe
- Coordinates: 41°51′N 1°27′W
- Country: Spain
- Autonomous community: Aragon
- Province: Zaragoza
- Municipality: Agón

Area
  - Total: 18 km^{2} (6.9 sq mi)

Population (2025-01-01)
  - Total: 135
  - Density: 7.5/km^{2} (19/sq mi)
- Time zone: UTC+1 (CET)
  - Summer (DST): UTC+2 (CEST)

Agón is a municipality located in the province of Zaragoza, Aragon, Spain. According to the 2004 census (INE), the municipality has a human population of one hundred and ninety three.

Agón is one of the municipalities on the La Garnacha-Campo de Borja Wine Route.

== See also ==
- List of municipalities in Zaragoza
