= Alberite de San Juan =

Alberite de San Juan, Spain
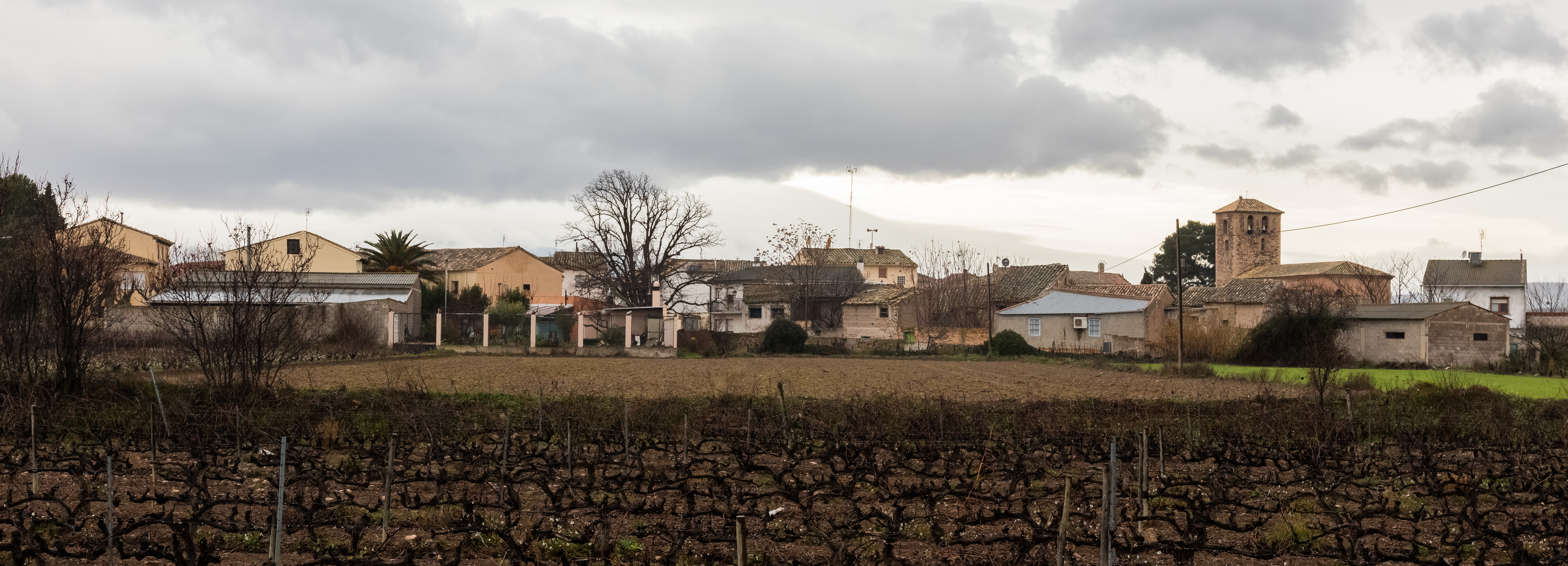

- Flag Coat of arms

- Location within Aragon Location within Spain Location within Europe
- Country: Spain
- Autonomous community: Aragon
- Province: Zaragoza
- Municipality: Alberite de San Juan

Area
  - Total: 11.23 km^{2} (4.34 sq mi)
- Elevation: 375 m (1,230 ft)

Population (2025-01-01)
  - Total: 79
  - Density: 7.0/km^{2} (18/sq mi)
- Time zone: UTC+1 (CET)
  - Summer (DST): UTC+2 (CEST)

Alberite de San Juan is a municipality located in the province of Zaragoza, Aragon, Spain. According to the 2004 census (INE), the municipality has a population of 102 inhabitants. According to the Alberite de San Juan website, () the population has since decreased.

== See also ==
- List of municipalities in Zaragoza
