= Tabuenca =

Coordinates: 41°42′N 1°33′W

- municipality
- Flag Coat of arms
- Interactive map of Tabuenca
- Country: Spain
- Autonomous community: Aragon
- Province: Zaragoza
- Comarca: Campo de Borja

Area
  - Total: 85 km^{2} (33 sq mi)
- Elevation: 779 m (2,556 ft)

Population (2025-01-01)
  - Total: 305
  - Density: 3.6/km^{2} (9.3/sq mi)
- Time zone: UTC+1 (CET)
  - Summer (DST): UTC+2 (CEST)

Tabuenca is a municipality located in the province of Zaragoza, Aragon, Spain. According to the 2010 census the municipality has a population of 412 inhabitants. Its postal code is 50547.

The town is located in a mountainous area west of the Moncayo Massif, close to the Sierra de Tabuenca, also known as Sierra del Bollón, after its highest peak, El Bollón (1036 m).

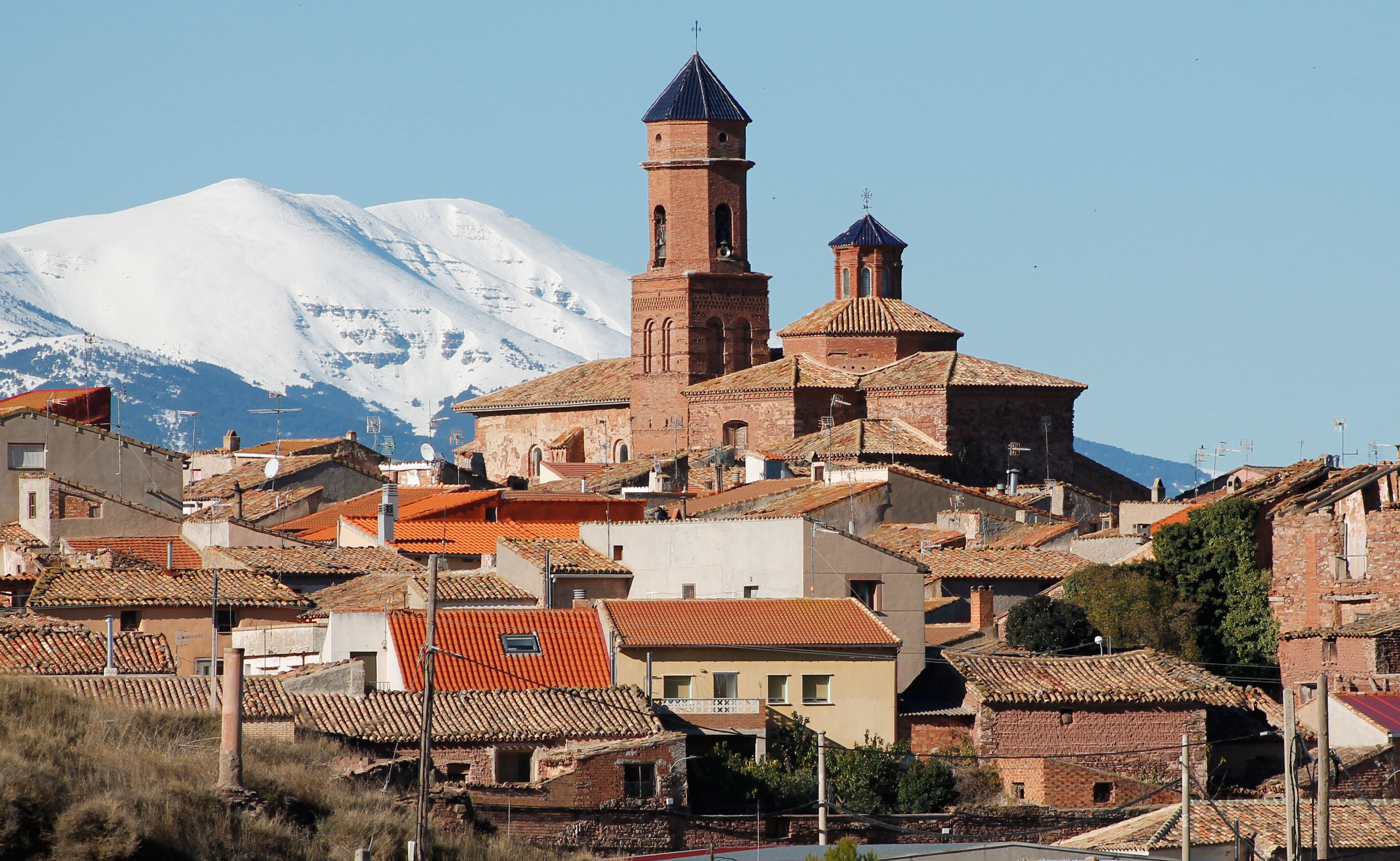
A view of the village of Tabuenca in Aragón, Spain

== See also ==
- Campo de Borja
- List of municipalities in Zaragoza
