= Ainzón =

Ainzón, Spain
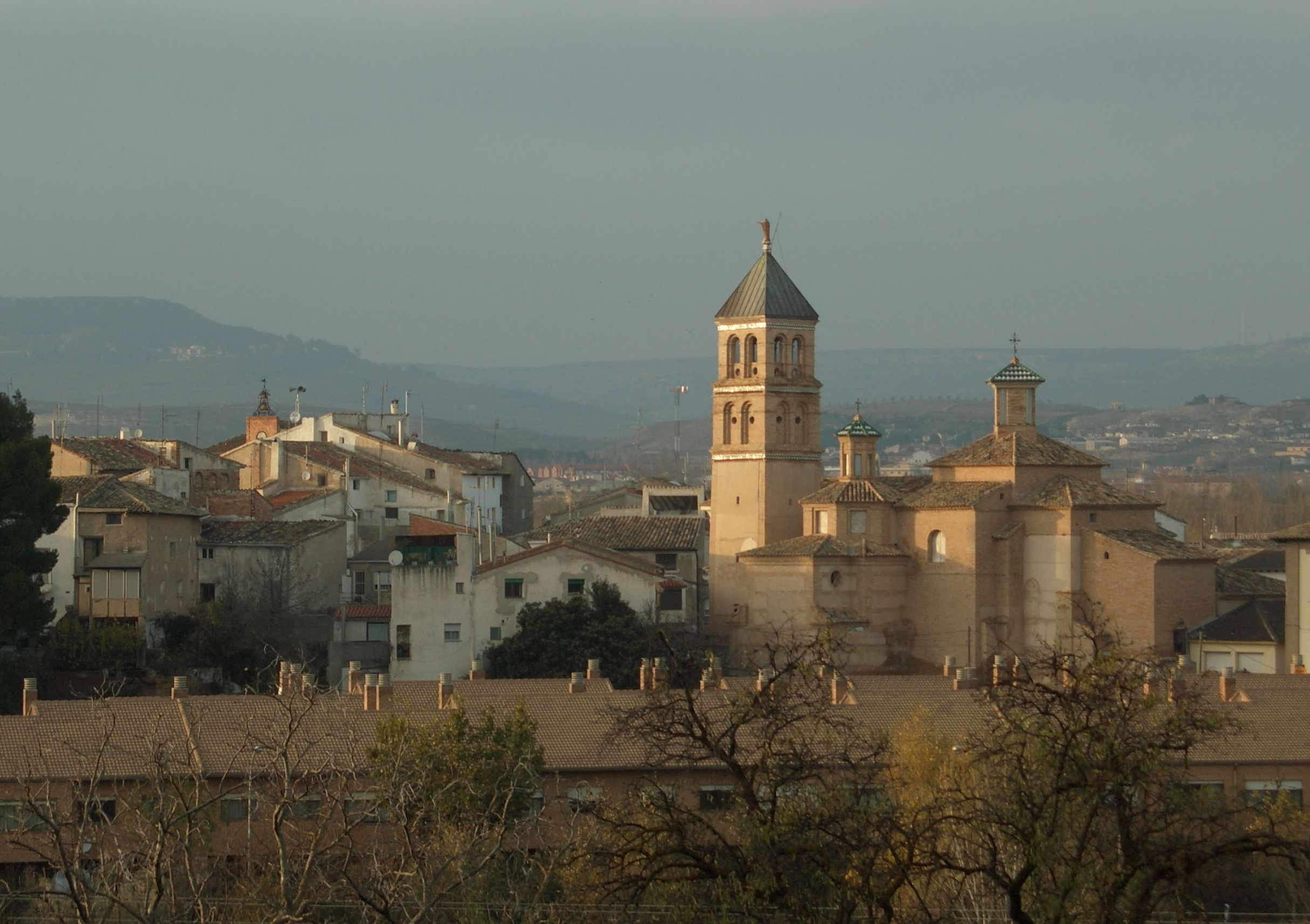

- Flag Coat of arms

- Location within Aragon Location within Spain Location within Europe
- Country: Spain
- Autonomous community: Aragon
- Province: Zaragoza
- Municipality: Ainzón

Area
  - Total: 40 km^{2} (15 sq mi)
- Elevation: 429 m (1,407 ft)

Population (2025-01-01)
  - Total: 1,036
  - Density: 26/km^{2} (67/sq mi)
- Time zone: UTC+1 (CET)
  - Summer (DST): UTC+2 (CEST)

Ainzón is a municipality located in the province of Zaragoza, Aragon, Spain. According to the 2004 census (INE), the municipality has a population of 1,229 inhabitants.

== See also ==
- List of municipalities in Zaragoza
