= Ambel, Zaragoza =

Ambel, Spain
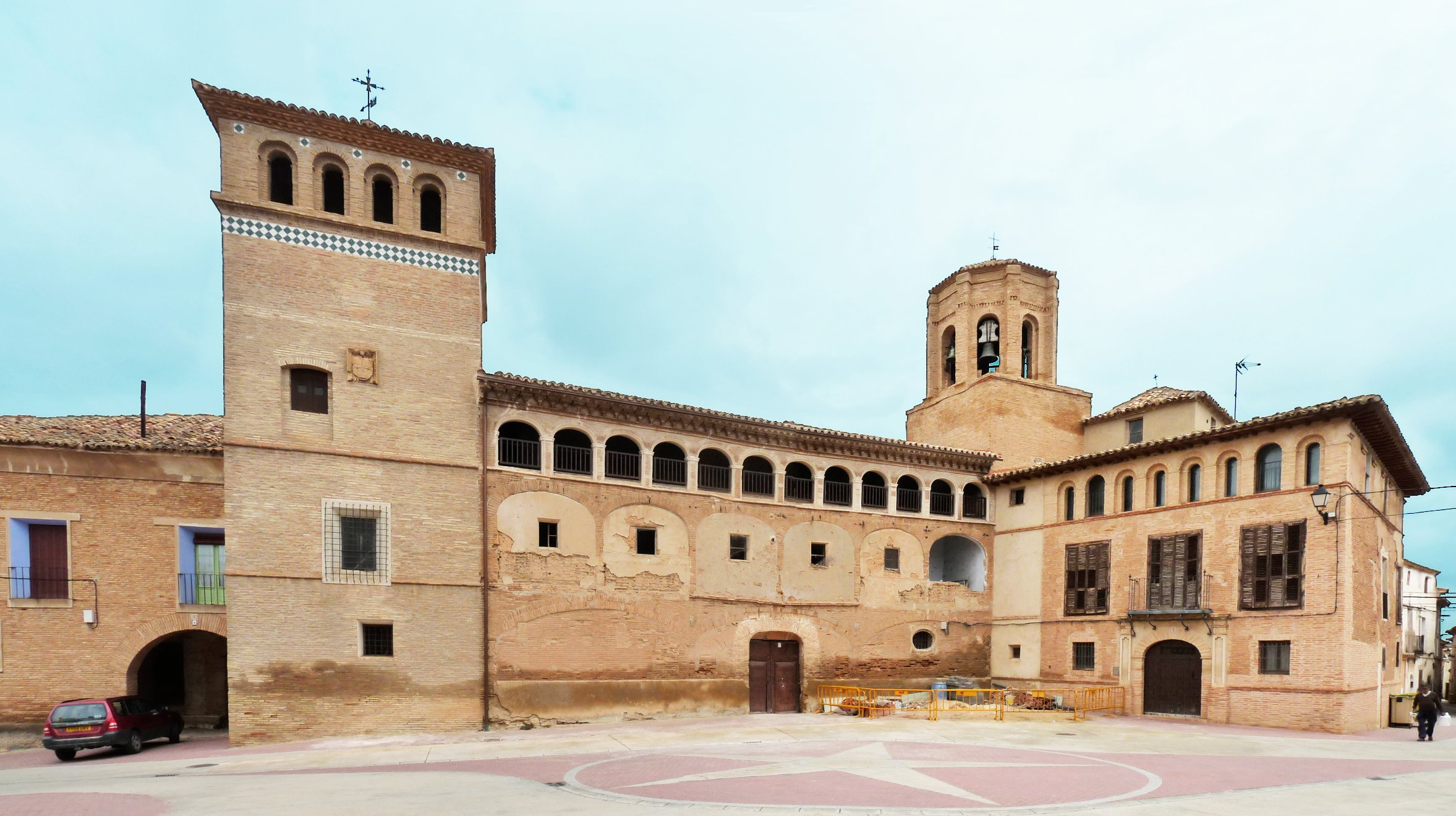
- Palace of the Order of Malta (16th century)

- Flag Coat of arms

- Location within Aragon Location within Spain Location within Europe
- Country: Spain
- Autonomous community: Aragon
- Province: Zaragoza
- Municipality: Ambel

Area
  - Total: 61 km^{2} (24 sq mi)

Population (2025-01-01)
  - Total: 253
  - Density: 4.1/km^{2} (11/sq mi)
- Time zone: UTC+1 (CET)
  - Summer (DST): UTC+2 (CEST)
- Website: ambel.org

Ambel is a municipality located in the province of Zaragoza, Aragon, Spain. According to the 2004 census (INE), the municipality had a population of 334 inhabitants.

== See also ==
- List of municipalities in Zaragoza
