= List of mountains in Aragon =

Summit of the Aneto

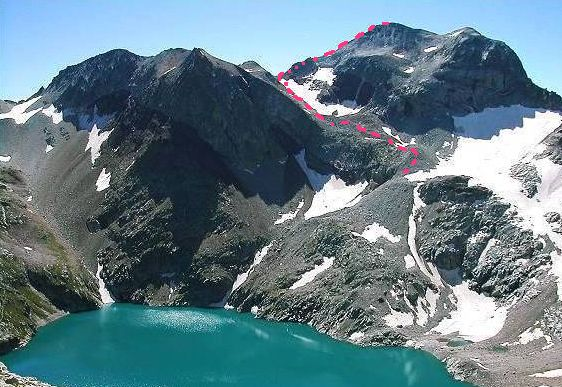
The Perdiguero Peak (right) rising above Portillon Lake

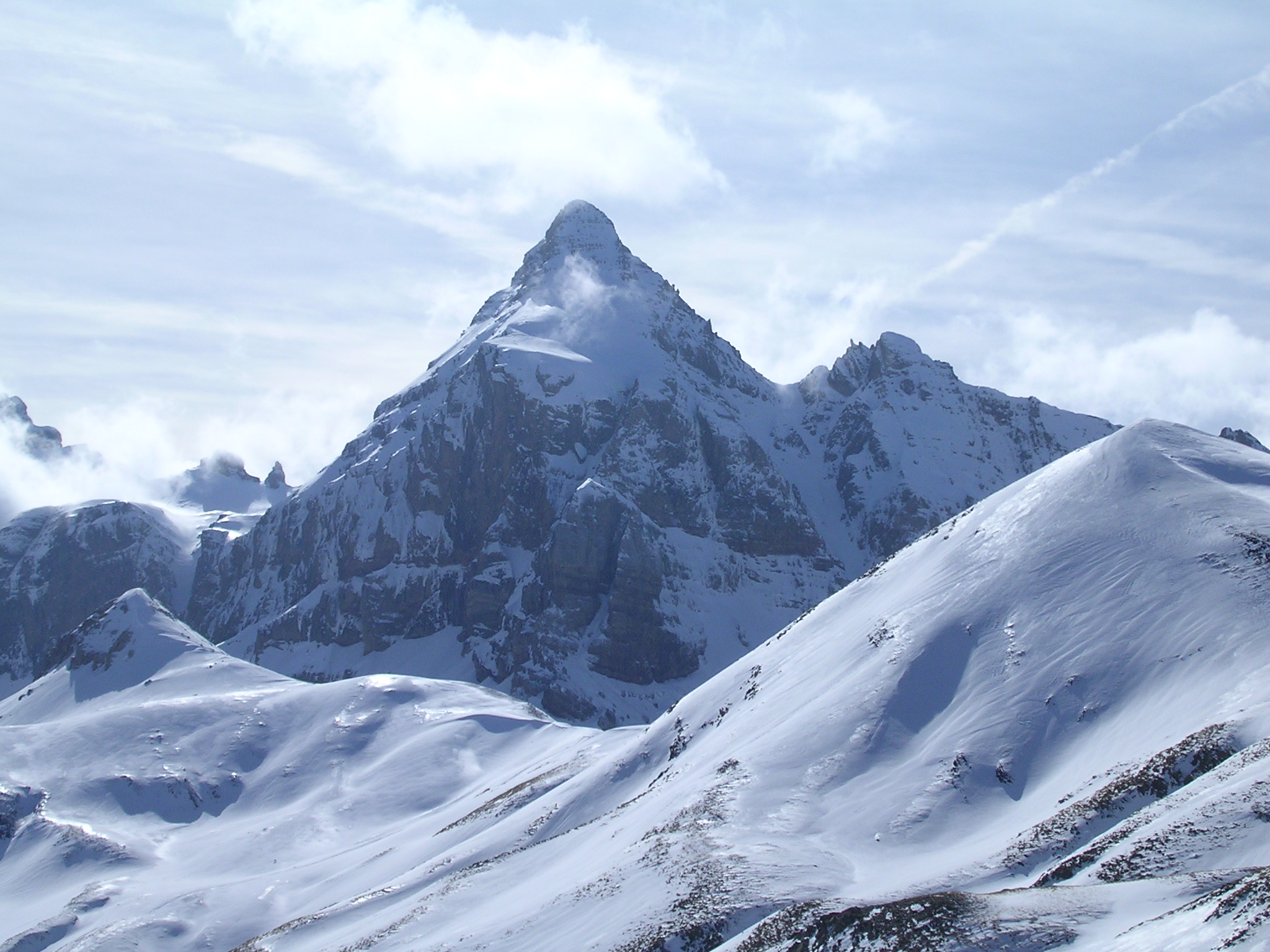
Escarra Peak

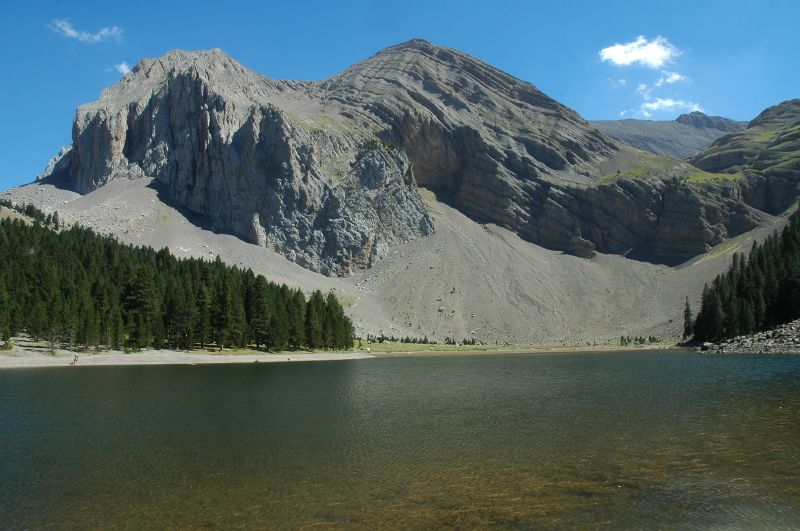
Ibon de Plan lake with Peña de las Once in the background

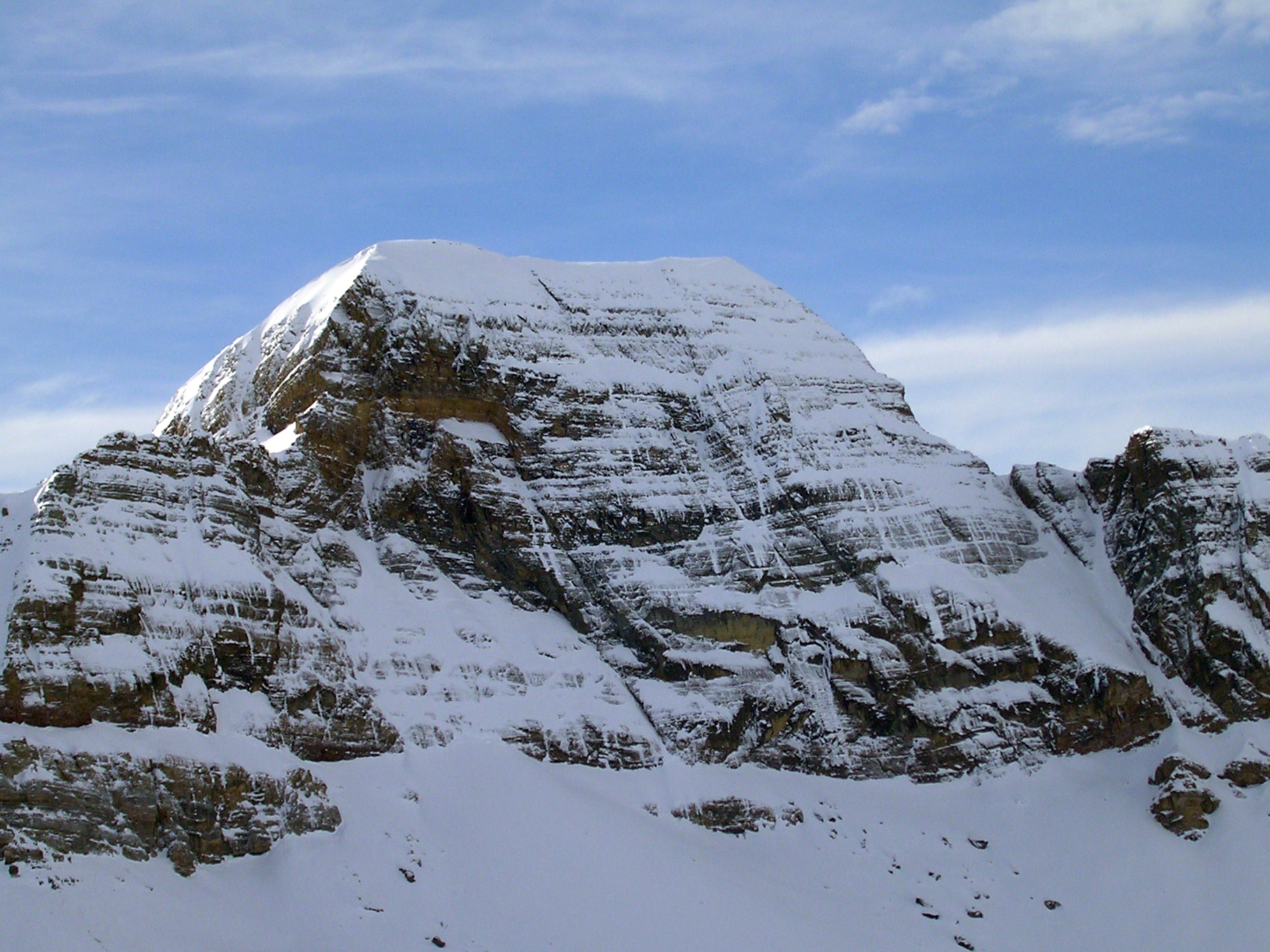
Pala de Ip seen from Formigal

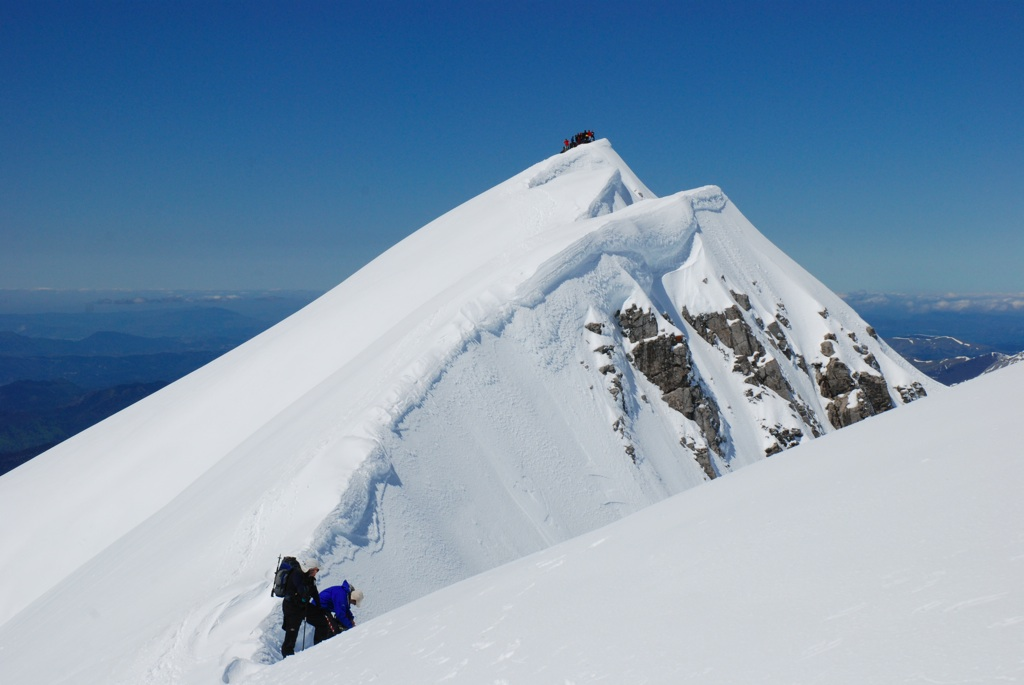
Bisaurin summit

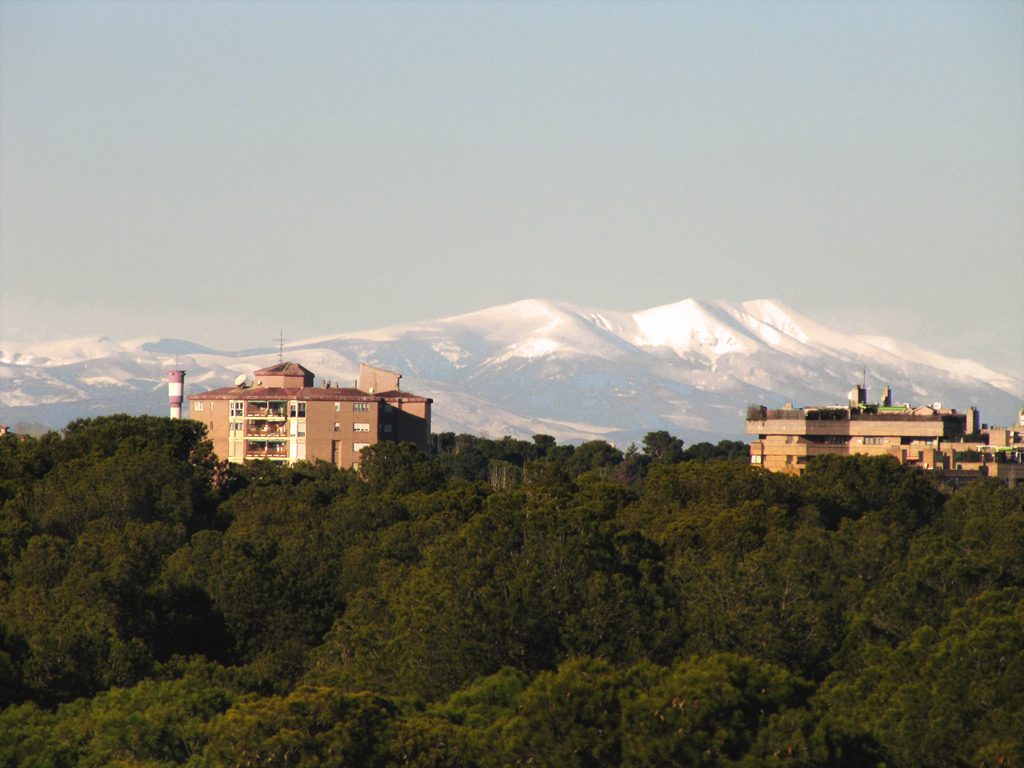
The Moncayo seen from Zaragoza

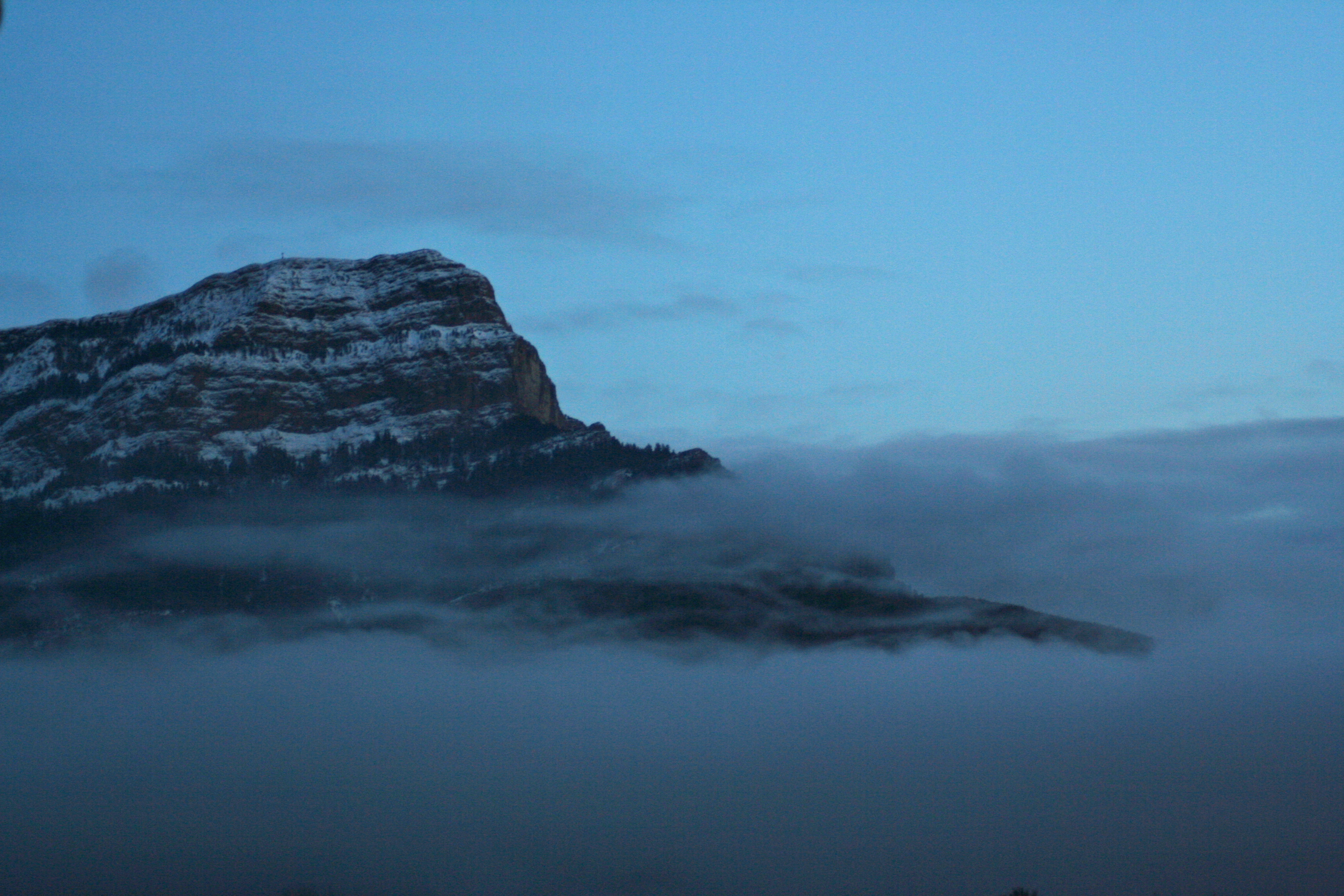
Penya Uruel or Peña Oroel above the mist

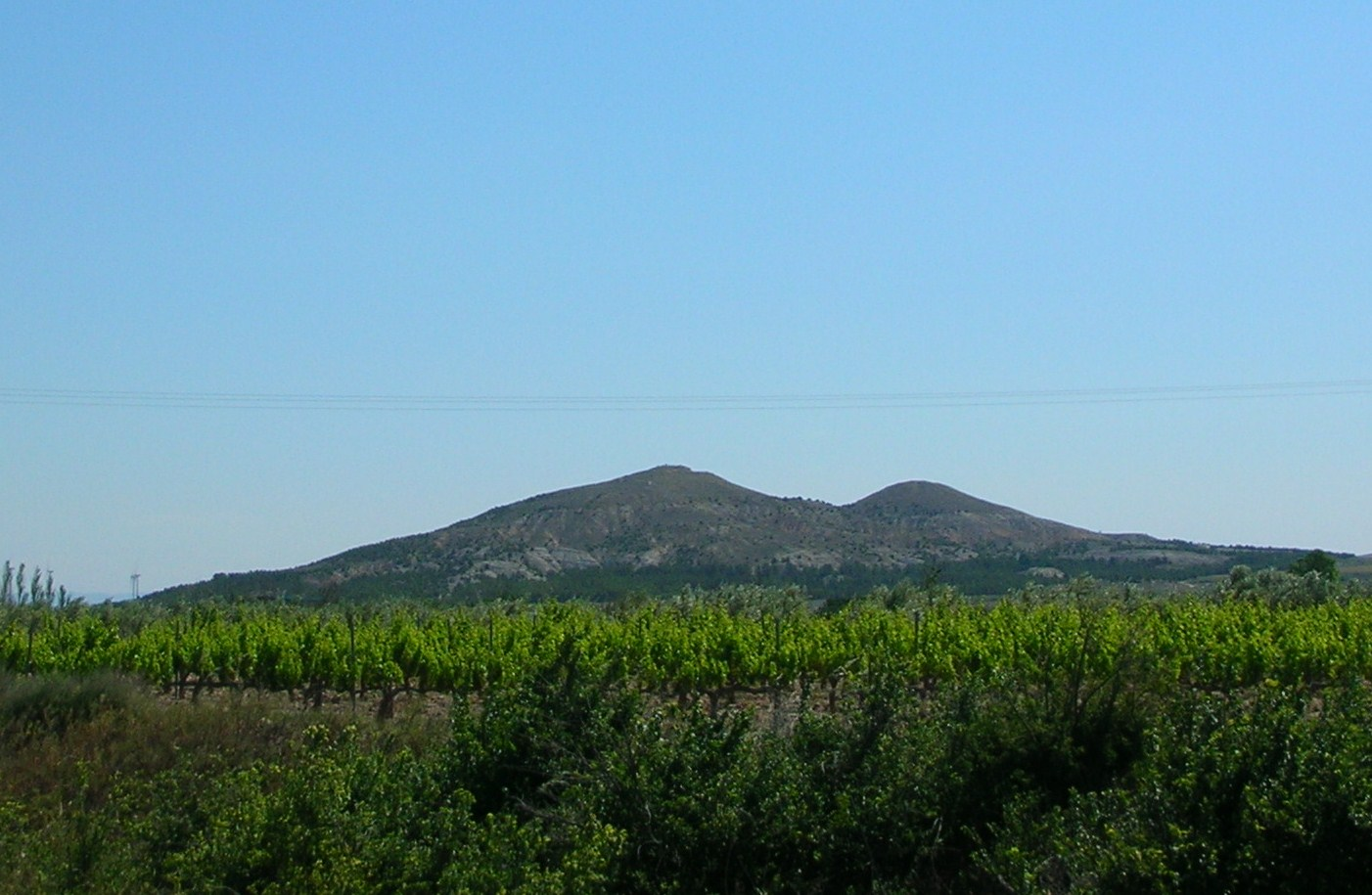
Burrén and Burrena, two breast-shaped hills located between Fréscano and Mallén

This is a list of mountains in Aragon, Spain. They include the Aneto, the highest peak in the Pyrenees, as well as the Moncayo, the highest peak in the Sistema Ibérico.

Mountains of Aragon by height
Name	Comarca	Range	Height	Observations
Aneto	Ribagorza	Maladeta Massif, Pyrenees	3404 m.	Highest peak in the Pyrenees
Posets Peak (Llardana)	Ribagorza	Pyrenees	3375 m.	
Monte Perdido	Sobrarbe	Monte Perdido Massif, Pyrenees	3355 m.	
Espadas Peak	Ribagorza	Pyrenees	3332 m.	
Cilindro de Marboré	Sobrarbe	Monte Perdido Massif, Pyrenees	3328 m.	France / Spain border
Perdiguero	Ribagorza	Pyrenees	3222 m.	France / Spain border
Pico Russell	Ribagorza	Maladeta Massif, Pyrenees	3205 m.	
Maladeta	Ribagorza	Maladeta Massif, Pyrenees	3312 m.	
Vignemale (Comachibosa)	Sobrarbe	Monte Perdido Massif, Pyrenees	3298 m.	France / Spain border
Soum de Ramond (Anyisclo)	Sobrarbe	Monte Perdido Massif, Pyrenees	3263 m.	
Bachimala (Pic Schrader)	Sobrarbe	Pyrenees	3177 m.	France / Spain border
Balaitus (Pico Os Moros)	Alto Gállego	Pyrenees	3144 m.	France / Spain border
Taillon Peak	Sobrarbe	Pyrenees	3144 m.	France / Spain border
La Munia	Sobrarbe	Pyrenees	3133 m.	France / Spain border
Pic de Gourgs Blancs	Ribagorza	Pyrenees	3129 m.	France / Spain border
Crabiules Peak	Ribagorza	Pyrenees	3116 m.	France / Spain border
Infiernos	Alto Gállego	Pyrenees	3073 m.	
Vallibierna Peak	Ribagorza	Pyrenees	3062 m.	
Garmo Negro	Alto Gállego	Pyrenees	3051 m.	
Argualas	Alto Gállego	Pyrenees	3046 m.	
Culfreda (Pic de Batoua)	Sobrarbe	Pyrenees	3034 m.	
Gran Eriste	Ribagorza	Pyrenees	3024 m.	
Tour du Marboré (Punta Faixón)	Sobrarbe	Monte Perdido Massif, Pyrenees	3009 m.	France / Spain border
Casque du Marboré (Punta Corral Ciego)	Sobrarbe	Monte Perdido Massif, Pyrenees	3006 m.	
Grande Fache (Pico Vachimanya)	Alto Gállego	Pyrenees	3005 m.	France / Spain border
Palas Peak	Alto Gállego	Pyrenees	2974 m.	France / Spain border
Punta Suelza	Sobrarbe	Pyrenees	2972 m.	
Llena Cantal	Alto Gállego	Pyrenees	2956 m.	
Cotiella	Sobrarbe	Cotiella Massif, Pre-Pyrenees	2912 m.	
Collarada	Jacetania	Pyrenees	2886 m.	
Tendeñera	Sobrarbe	Pyrenees	2858 m.	
Punta Tendenera	Alto Gállego / Sobrarbe	Sierra de Tendenera, Pyrenees	2853 m.	France / Spain border
Ixea Peak	Ribagorza	Pyrenees	2840 m.	
Pala de Ip	Alto Gállego	Pyrenees	2779 m.	
Peña Telera	Alto Gállego	Sierra Partacua, Pyrenees	2769 m.	
Escarra Peak	Jacetania	Pyrenees	2760 m.	
Pic de Sauvegarde	Ribagorza	Pyrenees	2738 m.	France / Spain border
Picollosa	Sobrarbe	Cotiella Massif, Pre-Pyrenees	2734 m.	
Gallinero	Ribagorza	Sierra Negra; Pyrenees	2728 m.	
Bisaurin	Jacetania	Pyrenees	2670 m.	
Ferreras Peak	Sobrarbe	Pyrenees	2653 m.	
Aspe peak	Jacetania	Pyrenees	2645 m	
Peña de las Once	Sobrarbe	Pyrenees	2630 m	Close to Ibon de Plan lake
Anayet	Jacetania	Pyrenees	2545 m	
Pic de Lourdes	Sobrarbe	Pyrenees	2516 m	
El Turbón	Ribagorza	Pre-Pyrenees	2492 m	
Cornadelo Peak	Ribagorza	Pyrenees	2443 m	
Maristás Peak	Sobrarbe	Pyrenees	2430 m.	
Royo Peak	Alto Gállego	Pyrenees	2429 m.	
Mesa de los Tres Reyes	Jacetania	Pyrenees	2428 m.	France / Spain border + limiting with Navarre
Peña del Mediodía	Sobrarbe	Pyrenees	2427 m.	Close to Ibon de Plan lake
Cerler Peak	Ribagorza	Sierra Negra; Pyrenees	2409 m.	
Peña Forca	Jacetania	Pyrenees	2391 m.	
Castillo d'Acher	Jacetania	Pyrenees	2384 m.	
Montimier	Sobrarbe	Sierra d'as Zucas, Pyrenees	2317 m.	
Moncayo	Tarazona y el Moncayo	Moncayo Massif; Iberian System	2314 m.	Highest point of the Iberian System
Mondiciero	Sobrarbe	Pyrenees	2296 m	
Peña Montañesa	Sobrarbe	Sierra Ferrera, Pre-Pyrenees	2291 m	
Punta Lierga	Sobrarbe	Montaña de Sarabiello, Pre-Pyrenees	2268 m	
Monte Sarasa	Sobrarbe	Pyrenees	2262 m.	
Peña Foratata	Alto Gállego	Pyrenees	2282 m.	
Pic Lariste (Punta Cristian)	Jacetania	Pyrenees	2168 m.	France / Spain border
Cerro de las Canales	Alto Gállego	Sierra Limes, Pyrenees	2136 m.	
Tuzal de Baziero	Ribagorza	Pre-Pyrenees	2115 m.	
Sestral Alta	Sobrarbe	Sestrales, Pre-Pyrenees	2106 m.	
Tozal de Guara	Alto Gállego	Sierra de Guara, Pre-Pyrenees	2077 m.	
Ezcaurri	Jacetania	Pyrenees	2050 m.	Between Aragon and Navarre
Manchoya	Alto Gállego	Pyrenees	2034 m.	
Javalambre	Gúdar-Javalambre	Sierra de Javalambre, Iberian System	2020 m.	
Javalambre	Gúdar-Javalambre	Sierra de Javalambre, Iberian System	2019 m.	
Castiello Mayor	Sobrarbe	Pre-Pyrenees	2014 m.	
Pelopín	Sobrarbe	Pyrenees	2007 m.	
Erata	Sobrarbe	Pyrenees	2003 m.	
Chamanchoya	Jacetania	Pyrenees	1935 m.	Between Aragon and Navarre
Peñarroya	Maestrazgo	Sierra de Gúdar, Iberian System	1935 m.	
Canciás	Alto Gállego	Sierra de Canciás, Pyrenees	1928 m.	
Auturía	Alto Gállego	Pre-Pyrenees	1920 m.	Saint Eurosia shrine located in this mountain
Peña Solana	Sobrarbe	Sierra Ferrera, Pre-Pyrenees	1903 m.	
Sierra Alta	Sierra de Albarracín Comarca	Sierra de Albarracín	1856 m.	
Muela de San Juan	Sierra de Albarracín Comarca	Montes Universales	1830 m.	
Carrascón	Maestrazgo, Aragon	Sierra de Sollavientos	1815 m.	
Nabaín	Sobrarbe	Sierra de San Martín de la Solana; Pre-Pyrenees	1799 m.	
Pico de l´Amorriador	Ribagorza	Mountains of Sis, Pre-Pyrenees	1791 m.	
Puialto	Ribagorza	Mountains of Sis, Pre-Pyrenees	1782 m.	
La Creu de Bonansa	Ribagorza	Mountains of Sis, Pre-Pyrenees	1765 m.	
Peña Oroel (Penya Uruel)	Jacetania	Pre-Pyrenees	1769 m.	
Hoyalta	Comunidad de Teruel	Sierra de El Pobo, Iberian System	1761 m.	
Tarayuela	Maestrazgo, Aragon	Sierra de las Dehesas, Iberian System	1737 m.	
Cruceta de Yeba	Sobrarbe	Sierra de San Martín de la Solana; Pre-Pyrenees	1719 m.	
Cabezo de las Cruces	Gúdar-Javalambre	Sierra de Nogueruelas; Iberian System	1710 m.	Between Aragón and the Valencian Community
Monte de San Ginés	Jiloca Comarca	Sierra Menera; Iberian System	1601 m.	Between Aragón and Castile-La Mancha
Pusilibro	Hoya de Huesca	Sierra de Loarre; Pre-Pyrenees	1595 m.	
Punta Güé	Alto Gállego	Pyrenees	1579 m.	
Peña de Herrera	Campo de Borja	Moncayo Massif foothills	1564 m.	
Peña Gratal	Hoya de Huesca	Sierra de Gratal; Pre-Pyrenees	1563 m.	
Campanué	Sobrarbe / Ribagorza	Sierra de Campanué; Pre-Pyrenees	1548 m.	
Santo Domingo	Cinco Villas, Aragon	Sierra de Santo Domingo; Pre-Pyrenees	1523 m.	
San Just	Cuencas Mineras	Sierra de San Just; Iberian System	1522 m.	
La Retuerta	Jiloca Comarca	Sierra de Pelarda; Iberian System	1510 m	
Altaió d'Aulet	Ribagorza	Mountains of Sis, Pre-Pyrenees	1490 m.	
Coronillas	Comunidad de Teruel	Sierra de Camarena, Iberian System	1482 m.	
La Modorra	Jiloca Comarca	Sierra de Cucalón; Iberian System	1481 m.	
Tonda	Campo de Borja	Moncayo Massif foothills Iberian System	1434 m.	
Cabrera	Aranda / Comunidad de Calatayud	Sierra de la Virgen; Iberian System	1427 m	
Cerro de Santa Cruz	Campo de Daroca	Sierra de Santa Cruz; Iberian System	1423 m	
Pico del Rayo	Comunidad de Calatayud	Sierra de Vicort, Iberian System	1420 m.	
Xirola	Hoya de Huesca	Sierra de Javierre; Pre-Pyrenees	1379 m	
Tossal dels Tres Reis	Matarranya	Ports de Beseit	1350 m.	Confluence of Aragon, Catalonia & Valencia
Unnamed Peak	Cinco Villas, Aragon	Sierra de Leyre; Pre-Pyrenees	1347 m.	Between Navarre and Aragon
La Rocha	Jiloca Comarca	Sierra de Oriche; Iberian System	1340 m.	
Pozo Peak (Tozal d'o Pozo)	Sobrarbe	Sierra de San Visorio; Pre-Pyrenees	1316 m.	
Puig Moné	Cinco Villas, Aragon	Sierra de Luesia; Pre-Pyrenees	1313 m	
Cucuta	Comunidad de Calatayud	Sierra de la Virgen; Iberian System	1300 m	
Pico de Valdemadera	Campo de Cariñena	Sierra de Algairén	1276 m	
La Coscollosa	Matarranya	Ports de Beseit	1231 m.	Between Aragon and Catalonia
Moleta d'Arany	Matarranya	Ports de Beseit	1228 m.	
Mola de La Serreta	Matarranya	Ports de Beseit	1221 m.	
Loma Gorda	Comunidad de Teruel	Iberian System	1219 m.	
Muela Carrascosa	Maestrazgo	Sierra Carrascosa; Iberian System	1214 m	
Las Artigas	Maestrazgo	Sierra de Caballos; Iberian System	1205 m	
Castillet	Sobrarbe / Ribagorza	Sierra de Campanué; Pre-Pyrenees	1161 m.	
Peña de las Armas	Valdejalón	Sierra de Nava Alta	1154 m	
El Corral de Villaseca	Maestrazgo	Sierra de la Garrocha; Iberian System	1138 m	
El Cuchillo	Maestrazgo	Sierra de la Garrocha; Iberian System	1114 m	
Cabezo de Purujosa	Aranda	Moncayo Massif; Iberian System	1106 m.	
Moletó del Mas de Pau	Matarranya	Ports de Beseit	1076 m.	
Peña Nobla	Jacetania/Cinco Villas	Sierra Nobla; Pre-Pyrenees	1076 m	
L'Argaret	Matarranya	Ports de Beseit	1071 m.	
Tossal de Cornudella	Ribagorza	Mountains of Sis, Pre-Pyrenees	1066 m.	
San Juan	Maestrazgo	Sierra de la Garrocha; Iberian System	1051 m	
Macizo d'os Fils	Hoya de Huesca	Mallos de Riglos; Pre-Pyrenees	1045 m.	
Pie Gordo	Campo de Borja	Sierra del Bollón	1043 m.	
Sima de Calmarza	Comunidad de Calatayud	Sierra de Solorio	1039 m	
Penyagalera	Matarranya	Ports de Beseit	1029 m	
Peña Musera	Jacetania/Cinco Villas	Sierra Nobla; Pre-Pyrenees	995 m	
Buitrera	Valdejalón	Sierra de Nava Alta	994 m	
Cucutas	Andorra-Sierra de Arcos	Sierra de Arcos; Iberian System	987 m.	
Montalbos	Andorra-Sierra de Arcos	Sierra de Arcos; Iberian System	926 m.	
Monegre	Valdejalón	Sierra de Nava Alta	922 m.	
Tossal de l'Obac	Ribagorza	Serra d'Estopinyà; Pre-Pyrenees	897 m.	
Guardias	Andorra-Sierra de Arcos	Sierra de Los Moros; Iberian System	894 m.	
Vulturina	Ribagorza	Pre-Pyrenees	889 m.	
Alto de la Muga	Tarazona y el Moncayo	Montes del Cierzo	861 m.	Near the confluence of Aragon, Navarra & La Rioja
Coronas	Andorra-Sierra de Arcos	Sierra de Arcos; Iberian System	853 m.	
Monte Oscuro	Monegros	Sierra de Alcubierre	822 m.	
San Caprasio	Monegros	Sierra de Alcubierre	811 m.	
Esteban	Cinco Villas, Aragon	Castejón Mountains	747 m.	
Montpedró	La Litera	Isolated hill	736 m.	
Lobo	Campo de Belchite	Isolated hill	630 m.	
Sigena	Monegros	Sierra de Alcubierre	592 m.	Located south of Villanueva de Sijena
Cabezo de Altomira	Campo de Cariñena	Isolated hill	575 m.	
Coll de la Forca	Matarranya	Isolated hill	508 m.	
Alto de los Auts	Bajo Aragón-Caspe	Auts	434 m.	
Purburell or Pui Burell	Ribera Baja del Ebro	Montes de la Retuerta de Pina	417 m.	
Burrén and Burrena	Campo de Borja	Isolated hills near Fréscano	413 m.	
La Talaia	Bajo Aragón-Caspe	Sierra de Caspe	341 m.	

== See also ==
- List of Pyrenean three-thousanders
- Pyrenees
- Pre-Pyrenees
- Iberian System
- List of mountains in Catalonia
- List of mountains in the Valencian Community
