= Death of Esther Dingley =

Disappearance and death of a British hiker in the Pyrenees

Esther Dingley
- Disappeared: 22 November 2020 (age 37); Pic de Sauvegarde, France
- Status: Deceased
- Known for: Hiking around Europe and blogging

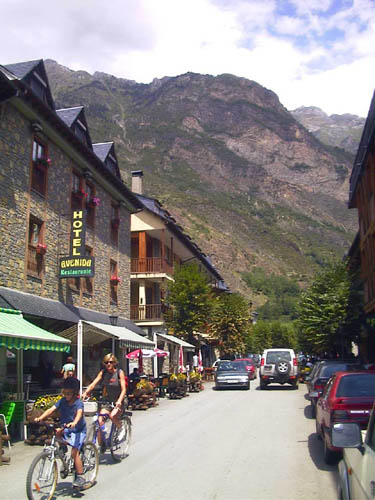
Benasque, the last place where Esther Dingley was seen

Esther Dingley was a British woman who disappeared in November 2020 while hiking in the Pyrenees. On 23 July 2021, part of Dingley's skull was found near a track by mountain runners. On 9 August of that same year, her partner Daniel Colegate found her other remains.

== Background ==
Esther Dingley and her partner, Dan Colegate, met as students at Wadham College, Oxford. They began hiking around Europe in 2014, living in a campervan and recording their experiences in a blog. Both partners were dealing with severe health problems: Colegate had depression and had nearly died from necrotising fasciitis he had contracted during surgery, while Dingley had chronic fatigue syndrome.

On the day of Dingley's last known communication, which was with Colegate on 22 November, the couple had been profiled on the front page of the BBC News website. The BBC story, written while Dingley had left on a solo hiking trip, includes a contemporary interview with Colegate, who was house-sitting at a farmhouse in France, and Dingley, via a remote video link from the couple's campervan. Other articles about their trip and lifestyle appeared on other news sites around the same time.

== Disappearance ==
Dingley and Colegate completed an 80-day unbroken hiking trek through the Alps on the Via Alpina on 4 October 2020. After a further ten days travelling in their campervan, the couple took up temporary residence in a borrowed gîte in Gascony. On 22 October, Dingley set off on a solo trip in the campervan.

On 21 November, Dingley set off from Benasque, Huesca, Spain, for a multi-day hike. On 22 November at around 4pm, she sent Colegate short text messages via WhatsApp from the summit of the Pic de Sauvegarde, a 2,737-metre (8,980 ft) mountain in the Pyrenees. Colegate then made a video-call to Dingley lasting around 90 seconds. She planned to spend the night at the fr:Refuge de Vénasque, an unstaffed mountain refuge nearby, but it is not clear whether she did so. Three days later, on 25 November, Colegate reported Dingley missing after she failed to return from her solo trip. She is not known to have communicated with anyone during these three days.

The peloton de gendarmerie de haute montagne (PGHM) confirmed that they were searching for Dingley, which involved search teams and a helicopter. Colegate travelled to Bagnères-de-Luchon to take part in the search. However, in early December 2020, authorities announced that the search had halted due to heavy snow.

In February 2021, Colegate said that he was convinced that Dingley had been taken "against her will" and that "somebody else was involved". He also suggested that Dingley might have been killed by hunters.

In spring and early summer 2021, the physical search for Dingley in the Pyrenees was resumed by both Colegate alone and by the French and Spanish authorities.

Colegate is being represented by the crisis support organisation LBT Global.

== Remains found ==
Around 23 July 2021, human remains were found near the path below the Port de la Glère, a mountain pass a few kilometers to the west of where Dingley was last seen. On 30 July 2021, following DNA testing, the remains – part of a human skull – were confirmed to be Dingley's. On 9 August 2021, Colegate located the rest of her body.

On 13 August 2021, the investigation team announced that it was believed Dingley's death was due to an accidental fall, though investigations at that point were still ongoing.

On 1 October 2021, Colegate released a final statement on the couple's Facebook page that Dingley had been laid to rest, thanking the public for its support.

== See also ==
- List of solved missing person cases (2020s)
- List of unsolved deaths
