= Bisaurin =

Mountain in Spain

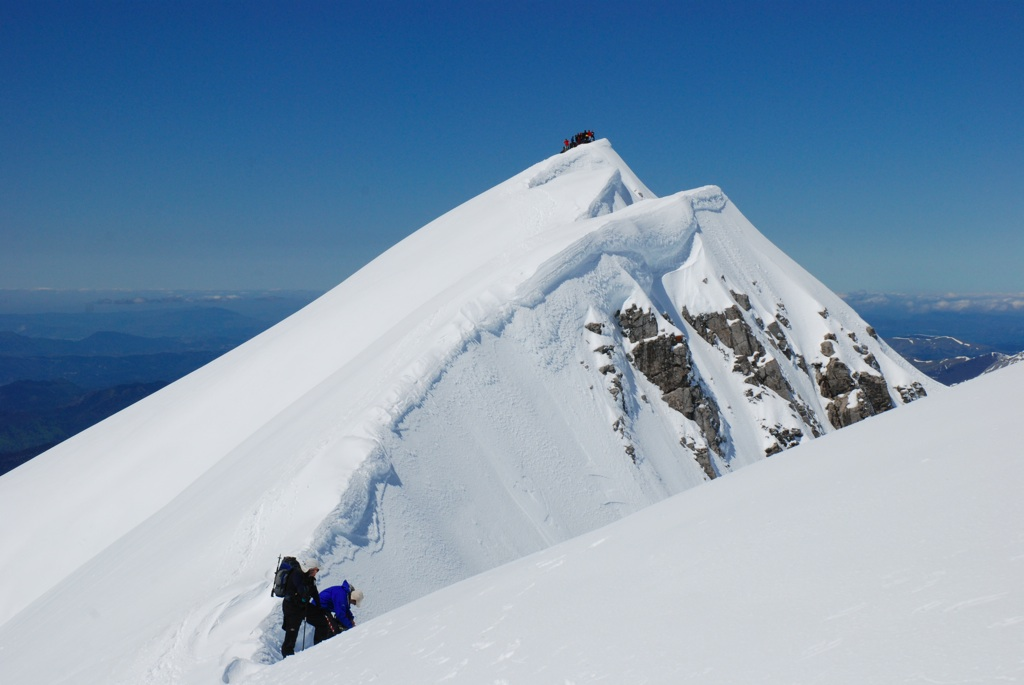
- Bisaurin summit

Highest point
- Elevation: 2,669 m (8,757 ft)
- Prominence: 1,038 m (3,406 ft)
- Isolation: 15.23 km (9.46 mi) to Collarada
- Listing: List of mountains in Aragon, Ribu
- Coordinates: 42°47′18.84″N 0°38′19.86″W

Geography
- Location within Pyrenees
- Location: Jacetania, Aragon, Spain
- Parent range: Pyrenees

Geology
- Mountain type: Karstic

Climbing
- First ascent: Unknown
- Easiest route: From Sansanet, France

Bisaurin (Spanish: Bisaurín; French: Bisaurín), or less frequently Visaurin, is a mountain on the Spanish side of the Pyrenees, located in the northwest of Jacetania comarca, in Aragon. At 2,669 m (8,757 ft) high, it is the highest peak between the Atlantic Ocean and the Pic du Midi d'Ossau (at 2,884 m). Its summit boasts views of many peaks including the Pic du Midi d'Ossau, the Balaïtous, and the central Pyrenean summits and Collarada to the east, as well as the Pic d'Anie to the northwest.

The mountain is located near the border with France, approximately 10 km (6.5 mi) west of the Candanchu ski resort and 22 km (14 mi) southwest of the Pic du Midi d'Ossau. It is most easily accessible from Sansanet on the French side of the border.
