= Plan, Aragon =

Coordinates: 42°34′N 00°20′W

Plan
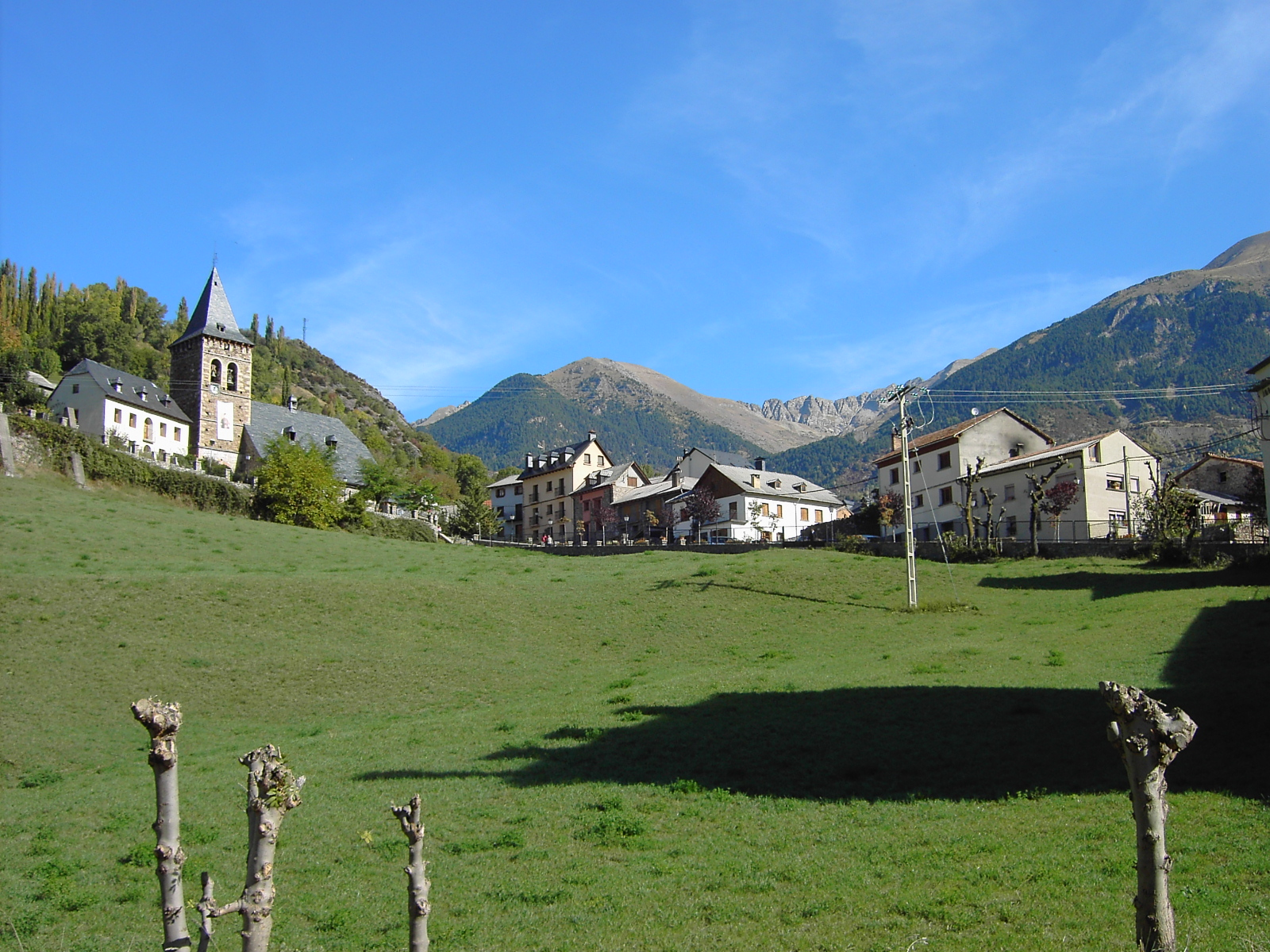
- View of Plan
- Country: Spain
- Autonomous community: Aragon
- Province: Huesca
- Comarca: Sobrarbe

Area
  - Total: 87.4 km^{2} (33.7 sq mi)
- Elevation: 1,119 m (3,671 ft)

Population (2025-01-01)
  - Total: 272
- Time zone: UTC+1 (CET)
  - Summer (DST): UTC+2 (CEST)

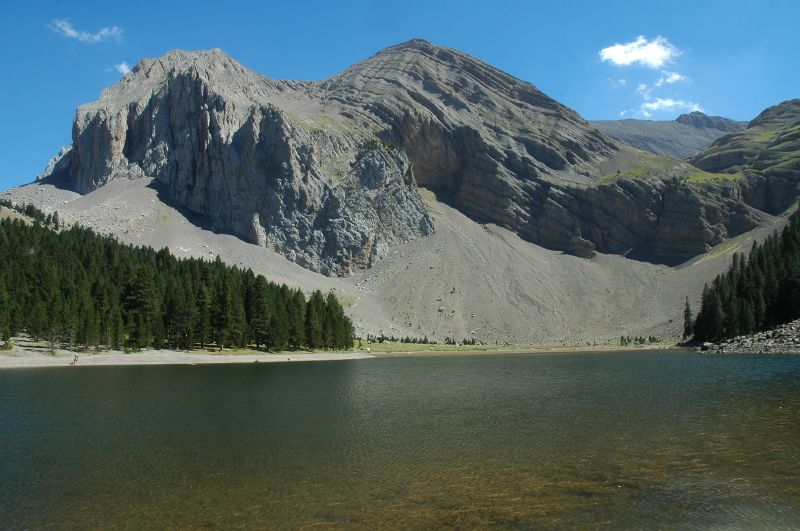
View of Ibon de Plan lake with Peña de las Once in the background

Plan is a municipality located in the Sobrarbe comarca, province of Huesca, Aragon, Spain. According to the 2010 census the municipality has a population of 336 inhabitants, and is the main populated center in the Gistau Valley. Its postal code is 22367.

The Ibón de Plan or Basa de la Mora lake is located within its municipal term and is said to be enchanted according to locals.

The village is one of the last places where Chistabino, the local dialect of Aragonese can be heard.

== The "caravan of women" ==
In 1985, Plan made Spanish news since local bachelors had organized a "caravan of women" after watching the American Western Westward the Women (1951), about recruiting single women to the frontier. At the time, the town had more than forty single men and just one single woman. Most of the local women had emigrated because of lack of work.

An advertisement in the press calling for "women between 20 and 40 with marriage intentions for Pyrenees village" resulted in 33 marriages, and the revitalization of Plan. Since then, other villages have organized similar "caravans".

== See also ==
- Lisdoonvarna, a village in Ireland with a matchmaking festival since 1857.
- Peña Montañesa
- Real Monasterio de San Victorián
- List of municipalities in Huesca
