= Sierra de Nava Alta =

Mountain range in Spain

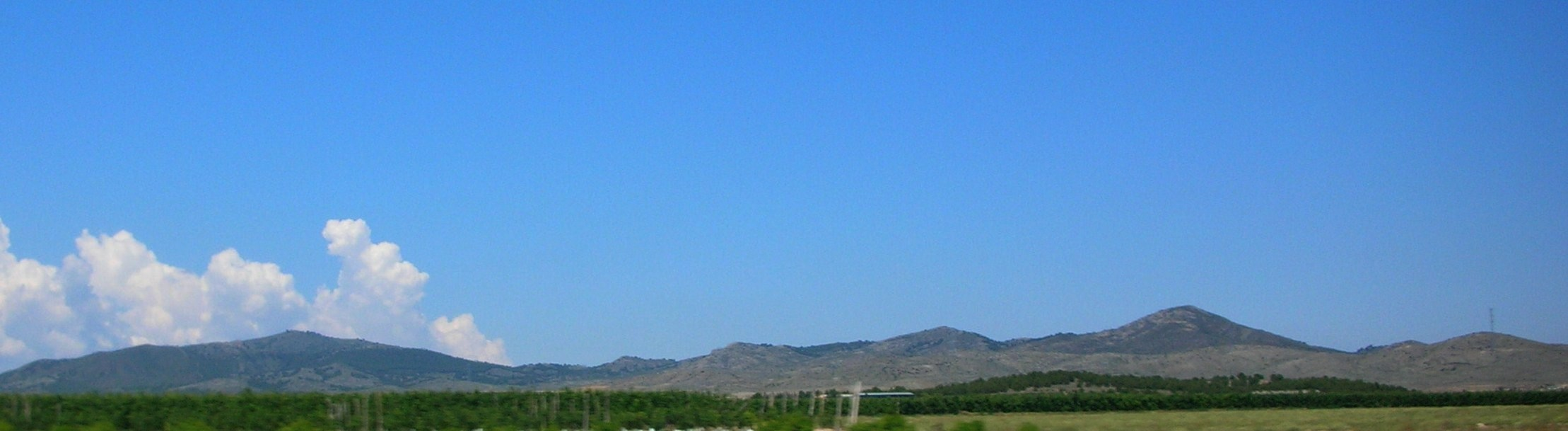
- Sierra de Nava Alta seen from near Ricla

Highest point
- Peak: Peña de las Armas
- Elevation: 1,154 m (3,786 ft)
- Listing: Mountains of Aragon
- Coordinates: 41°35′30″N 01°27′58″W

Geography
- Location within Spain
- Location: Tabuenca (Campo de Borja) Valdejalón (Aragon)
- Parent range: Iberian System, northern zone

Geology
- Orogeny: Alpine orogeny
- Rock age: Cretaceous
- Rock type: Limestone

Climbing
- Easiest route: Drive from Épila or Ricla

Sierra de Nava Alta or Sierra de la Nava Alta is a mountain range in the Valdejalón comarca, Aragon, Spain, located west of the A-121 road, between Fuendejalón and Ricla and east of Tierga and Mesones de Isuela.

== Geography ==
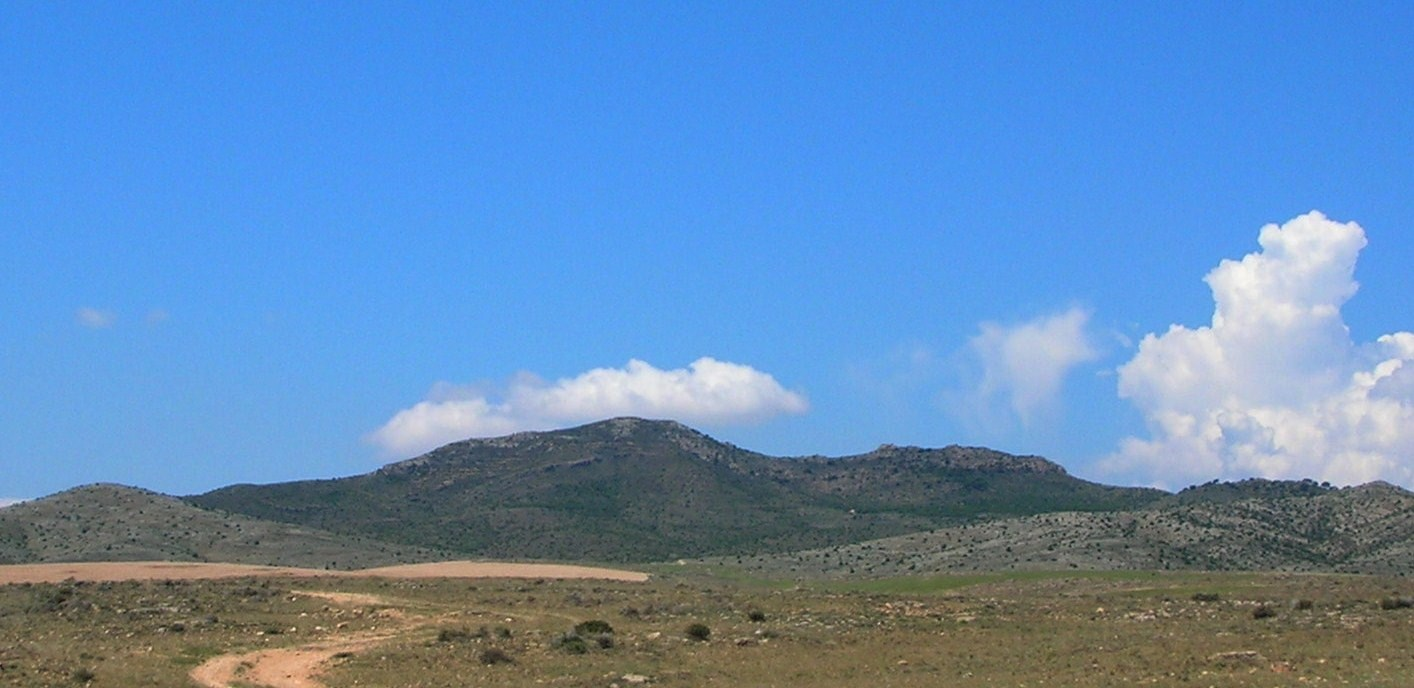
The 922 m high Monegre

The ridge's highest summits are Peña de las Armas (1,154 m), Buitrera de Valdearcos (994 m), and Monegre (922 m).

The Santuario de la Virgen de Rodanas is located in the Sierra de Nava Alta, about 12 km to the west of Épila town. The road to the sanctuary from Épila is not paved.

These mountains are covered with low and mostly sparse maquis shrub, with some juniper, Carrasca (Quercus ilex) and pine trees. They suffered intense exploitation in the past, with overgrazing by cattle and excessive firewood gathering.
