= Épila =

- municipality
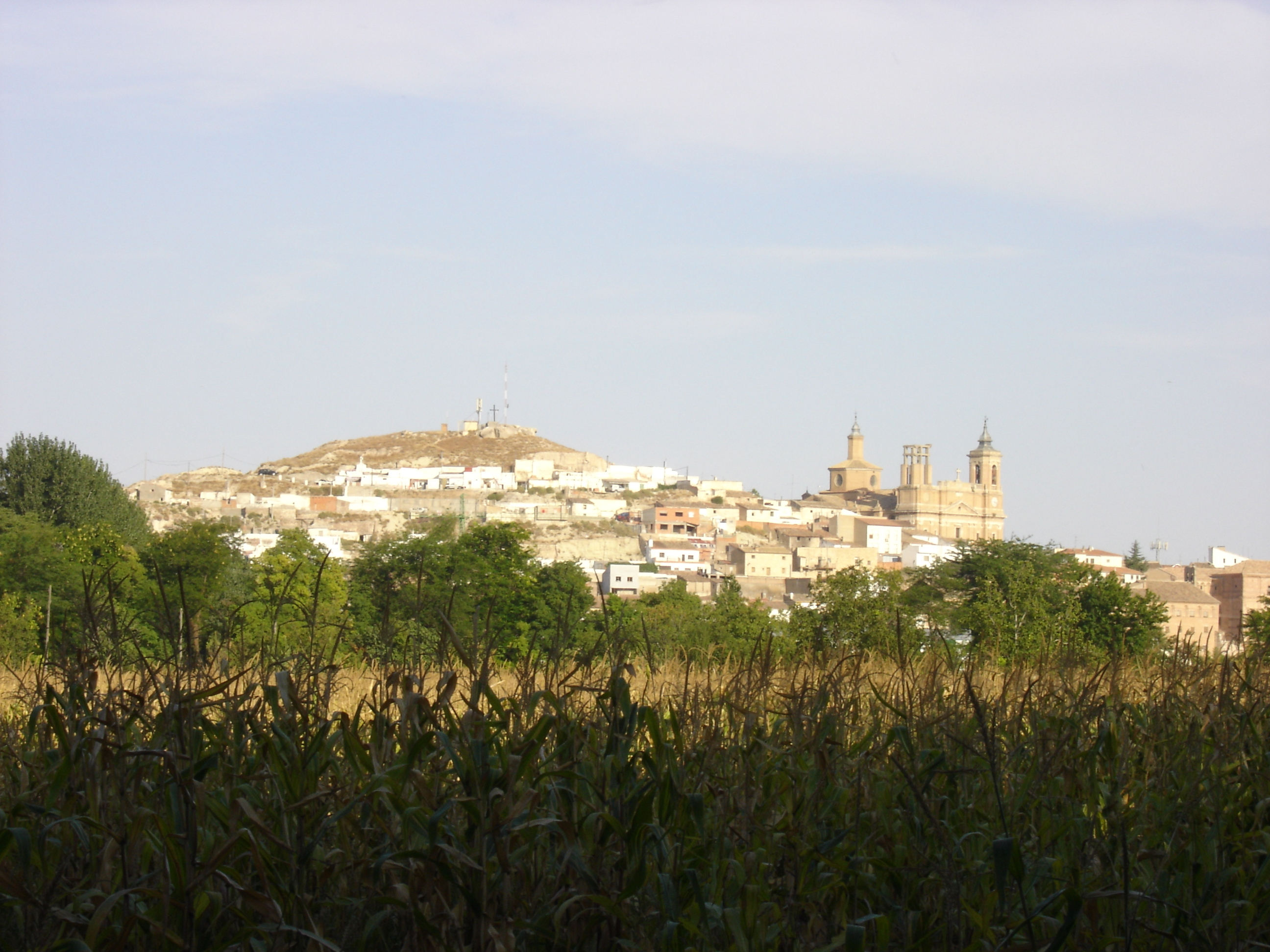
- Panoramic view

- Coat of arms

- Location within Aragon Location within Spain Location within Europe
- Coordinates: 41.600°N 1.283°W
- Country: Spain
- Autonomous community: Aragon
- Province: Zaragoza
- Comarca: Valdejalón

Area
  - Total: 19,432 km^{2} (7,503 sq mi)
- Elevation: 336 m (1,102 ft)

Population (2025-01-01)
  - Total: 4,704
- Time zone: CET
  - Summer (DST): UTC+1
- Postal code: 50290

Épila is a municipality in the province of Zaragoza, Aragon, Spain. Its population in 2005 was approximately 4,100.

The Santuario de la Virgen de Rodanas is located in the Sierra de Nava Alta, west of Épila town. The road to the sanctuary from Épila is not paved.

Motis Dolader estimates that between 163 and 271 Jews left the town during the 1492 expulsion.

== Personalities ==
John I of Castile was born in Épila.

== Photogallery ==
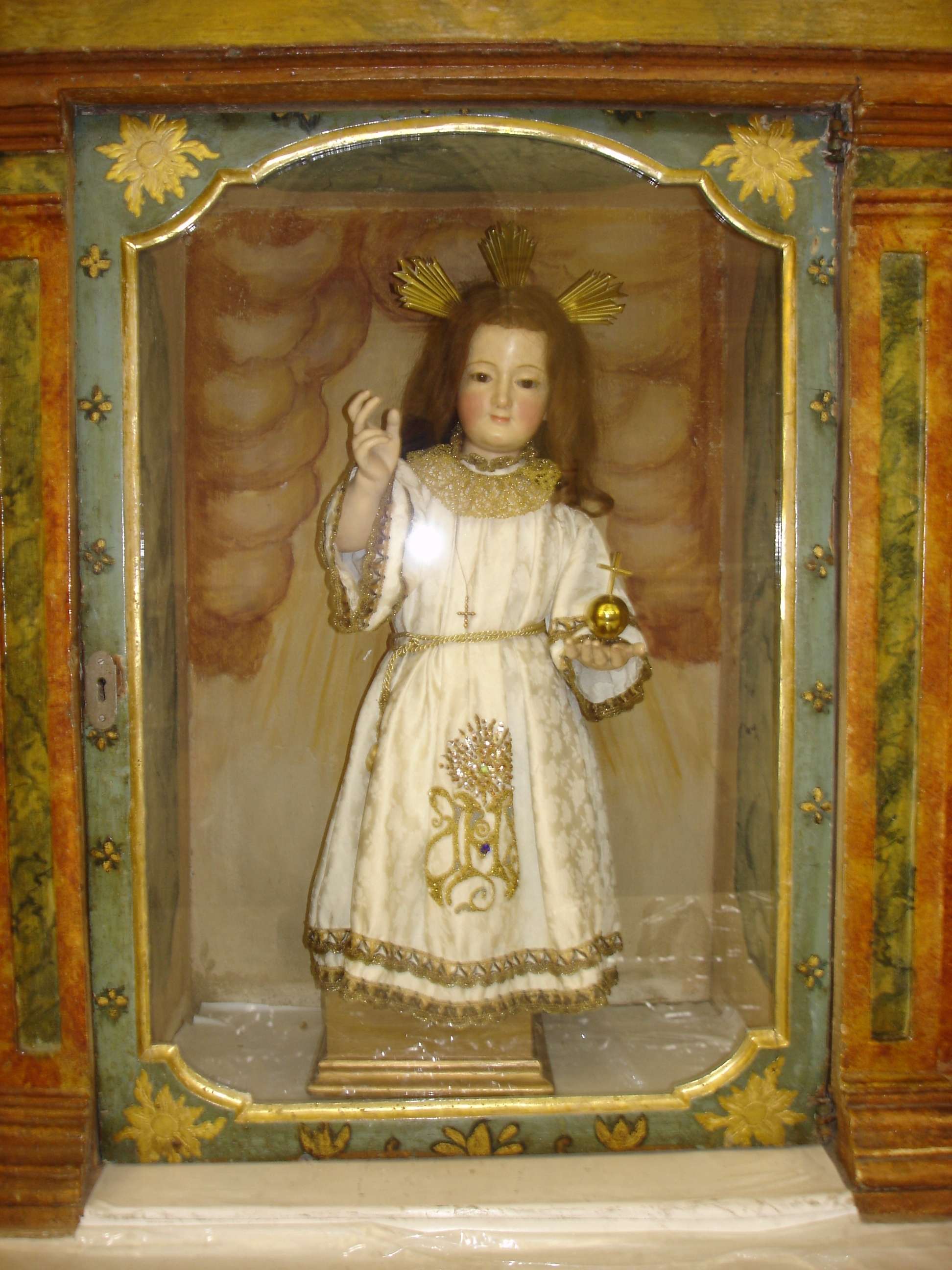
"El Cautivico" in Santa María la Mayor church

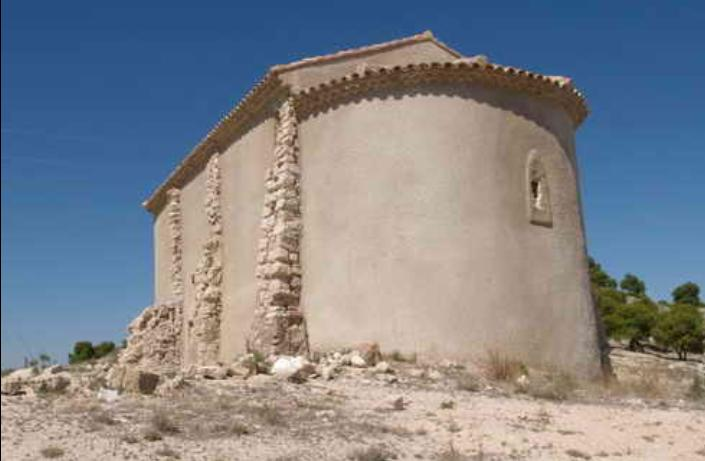
Romanesque chapel

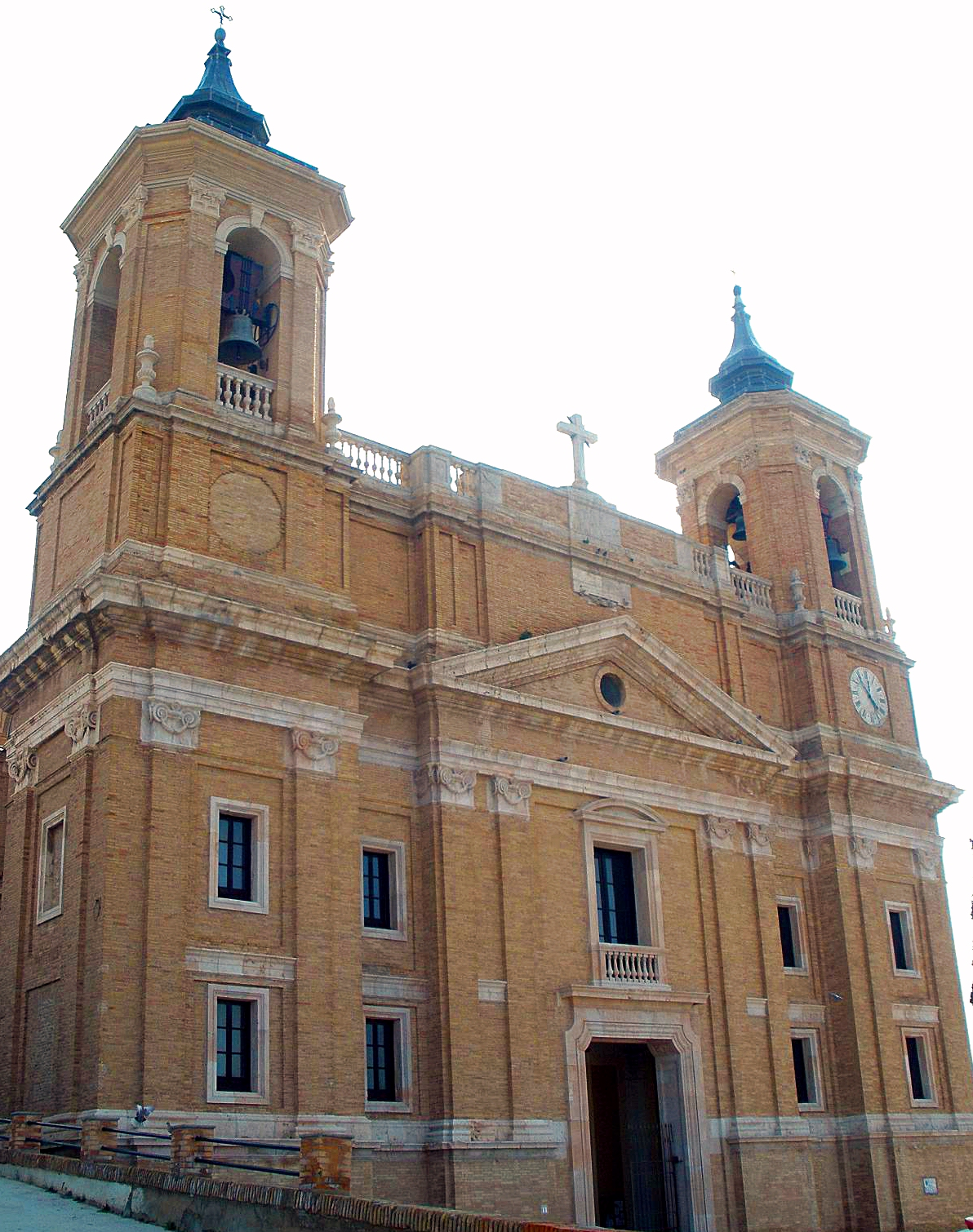
Santa María la Mayor church

== See also ==
- List of municipalities in Zaragoza
