= Mesones de Isuela =

Coordinates: 41°33′N 1°32′W

- municipality
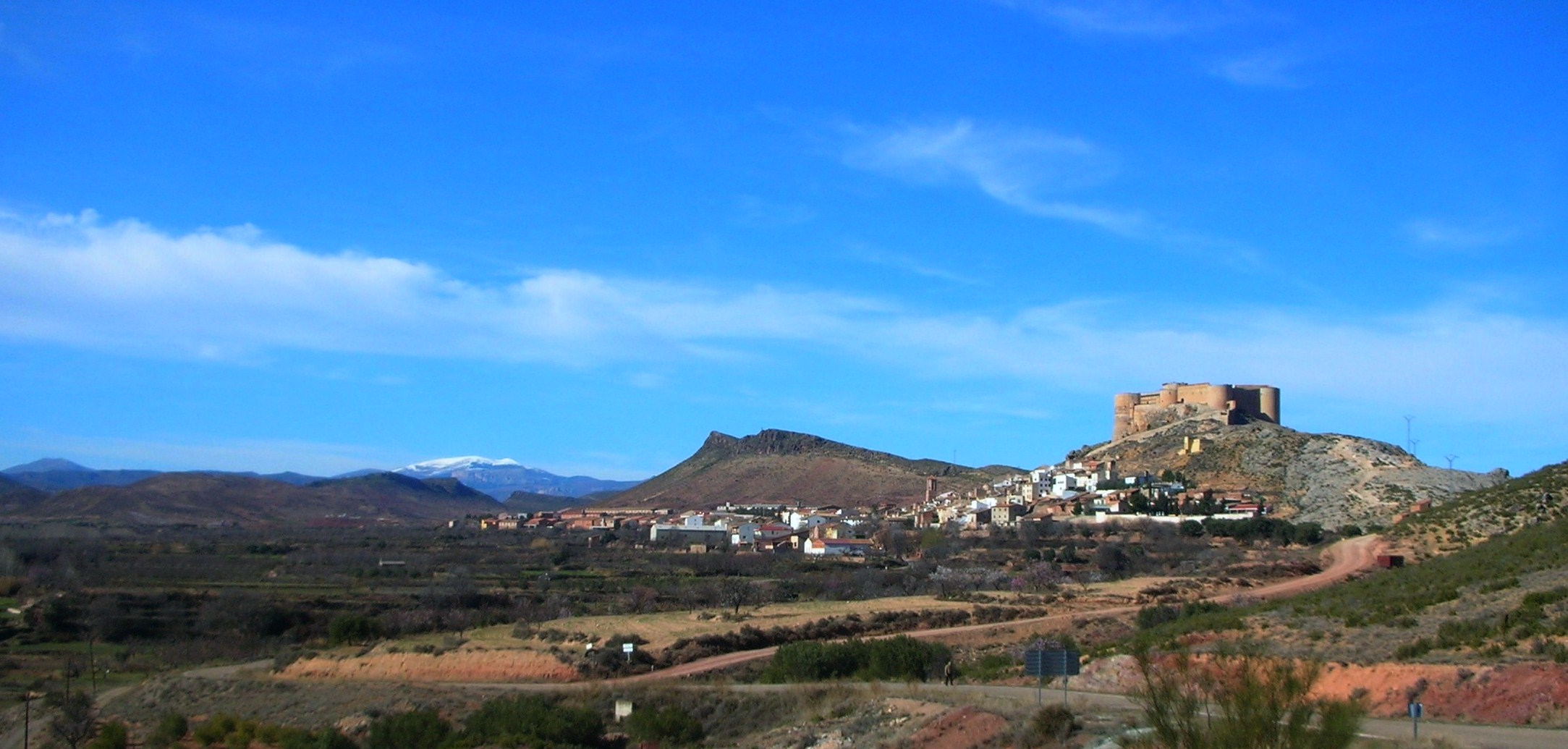
- View of Mesones de Isuela town with the Sierra de Nava Alta in the background and the Moncayo Massif covered in snow in the distance.

- Flag Coat of arms
- Interactive map of Mesones de Isuela
- Country: Spain
- Autonomous community: Aragon
- Province: Zaragoza
- Comarca: Comunidad de Calatayud

Area
  - Total: 48 km^{2} (19 sq mi)
- Elevation: 513 m (1,683 ft)

Population (2025-01-01)
  - Total: 270
  - Density: 5.6/km^{2} (15/sq mi)
- Time zone: UTC+1 (CET)
  - Summer (DST): UTC+2 (CEST)

Mesones de Isuela, also known as Mesones, is a municipality located in the province of Zaragoza, Aragon, Spain. According to the 2004 census (INE), the municipality has a population of 339 inhabitants.

== See also ==
- Comunidad de Calatayud
- List of municipalities in Zaragoza
