= Fréscano =

- municipality
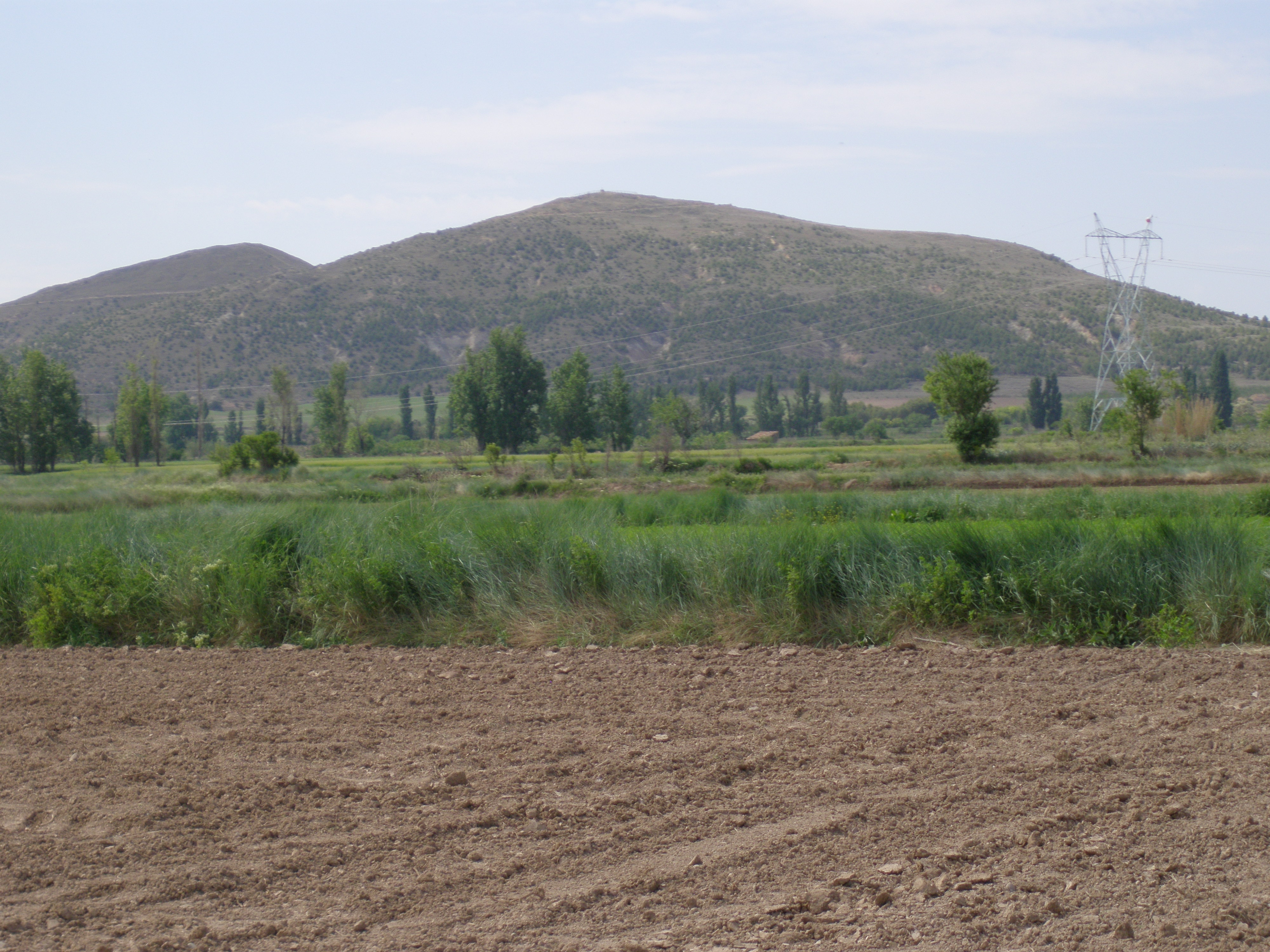
- Burrén and Burrena hills

- Flag Coat of arms

- Location within Aragon Location within Spain Location within Europe
- Country: Spain
- Autonomous community: Aragon
- Province: Zaragoza
- Comarca: Campo de Borja

Area
  - Total: 18 km^{2} (6.9 sq mi)
- Elevation: 220 m (720 ft)

Population (2025-01-01)
  - Total: 196
  - Density: 11/km^{2} (28/sq mi)
- Time zone: UTC+1 (CET)
  - Summer (DST): UTC+2 (CEST)

Fréscano is a municipality of province of Zaragoza, Aragon, Spain. It is located near the Huecha River, a tributary of the Ebro. According to the 2010 census the municipality has a population of 220 inhabitants. Its postal code is 50562.

== History ==
Burrén and Burrena are two 413 and 397 m high breast-shaped hills located between Fréscano and Mallén, where there is an ancient Iron Age Urnfield culture archaeological site.

== Gallery ==
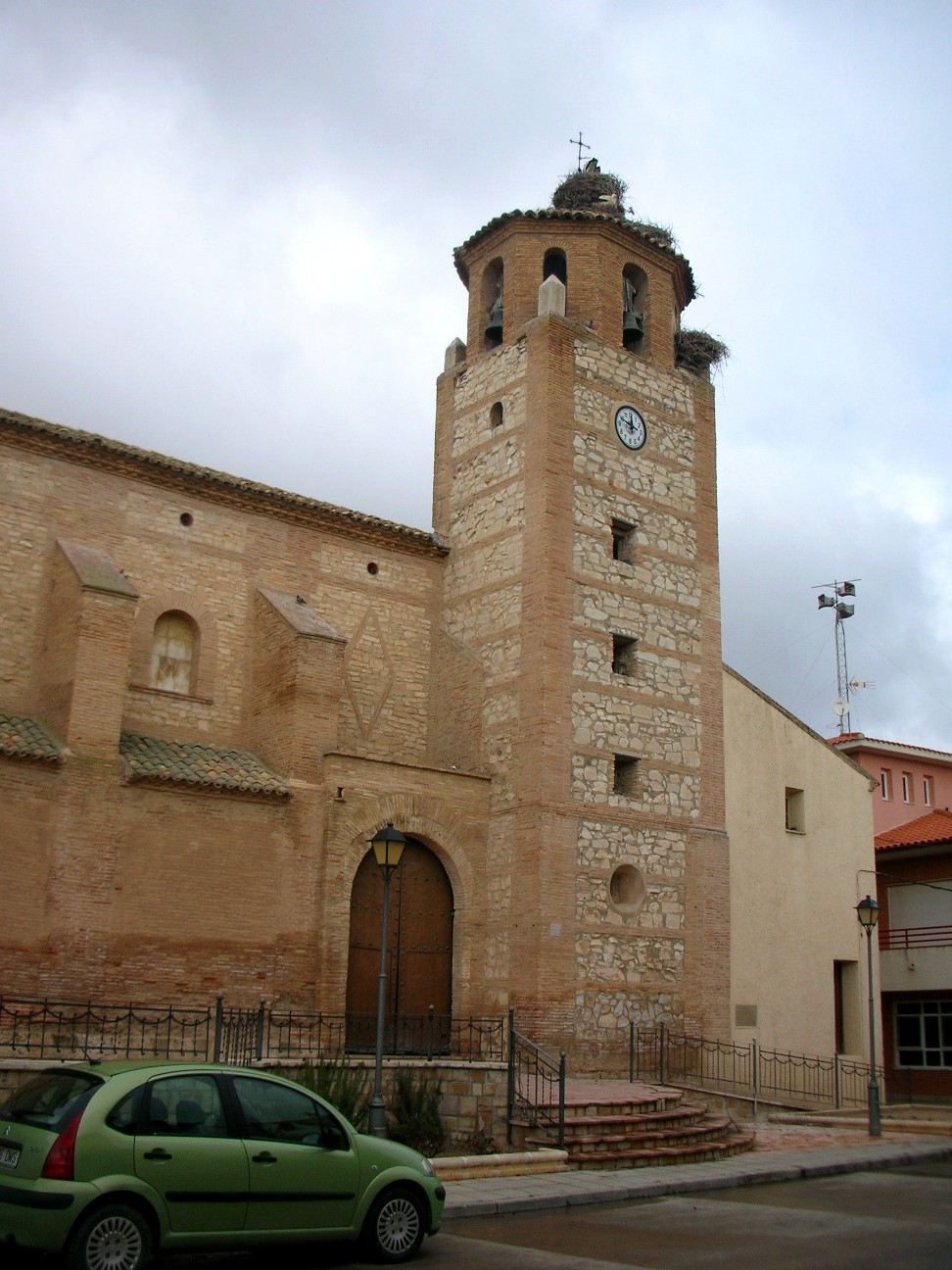
Fréscano bell tower with stork nests

== See also ==
- Campo de Borja
- List of municipalities in Zaragoza
