= Burrén and Burrena =

Twin hills in Aragon, Spain

- Las Dos Teticas
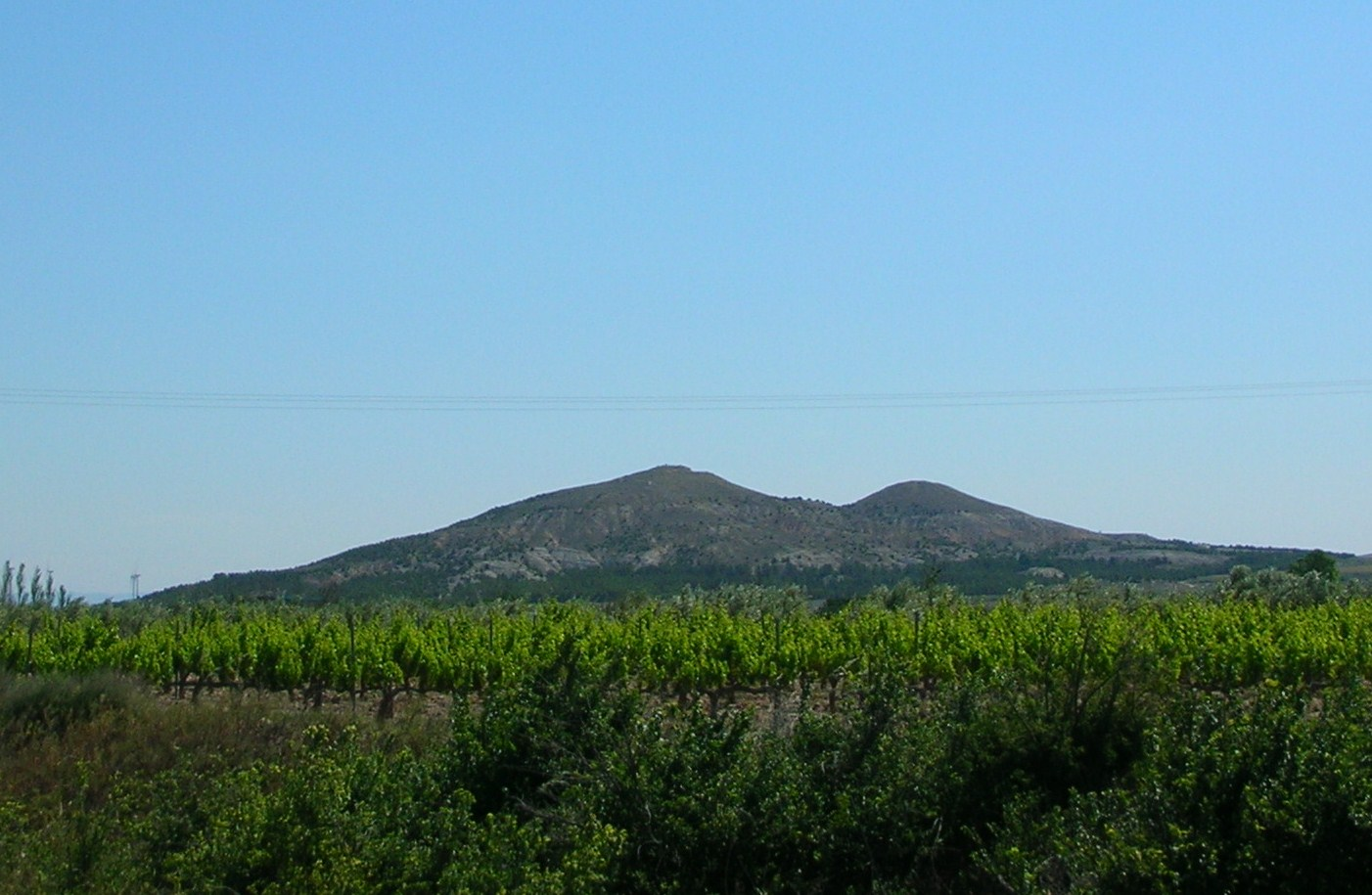

Highest point
- Elevation: 413 m (1,355 ft)
- Listing: Breast-shaped hills Mountains of Aragon
- Coordinates: 41°52′16″N 1°25′29″W

Geography
- Location within Spain
- Location: Campo de Borja, Aragon
- Parent range: Isolated hills

Geology
- Mountain type: Sedimentary rock

Climbing
- First ascent: Unknown
- Easiest route: From Fréscano or Mallén

Burrén and Burrena, known popularly as Las Dos Teticas, are twin hills in Aragon, Spain. They are located in the Fréscano municipal limits, near the road between this town and Mallén.

Burrén has an elevation of 413 metres (1,355 ft) and Burrena of 397 metres (1,302 ft) above sea level. There are two ancient Iron Age Urnfield culture archaeological sites beneath the hills. These sites have been declared Bien de Interés Cultural in the heritage register of the Spanish Ministry of Culture.

These mountains are isolated hills visible from far away in the flat landscape of northern Campo de Borja comarca.

== See also ==
- Mountains of Aragon
- Breast-shaped hills
