= Escarra Peak =

Mountain in Spain

- Punta Escarra
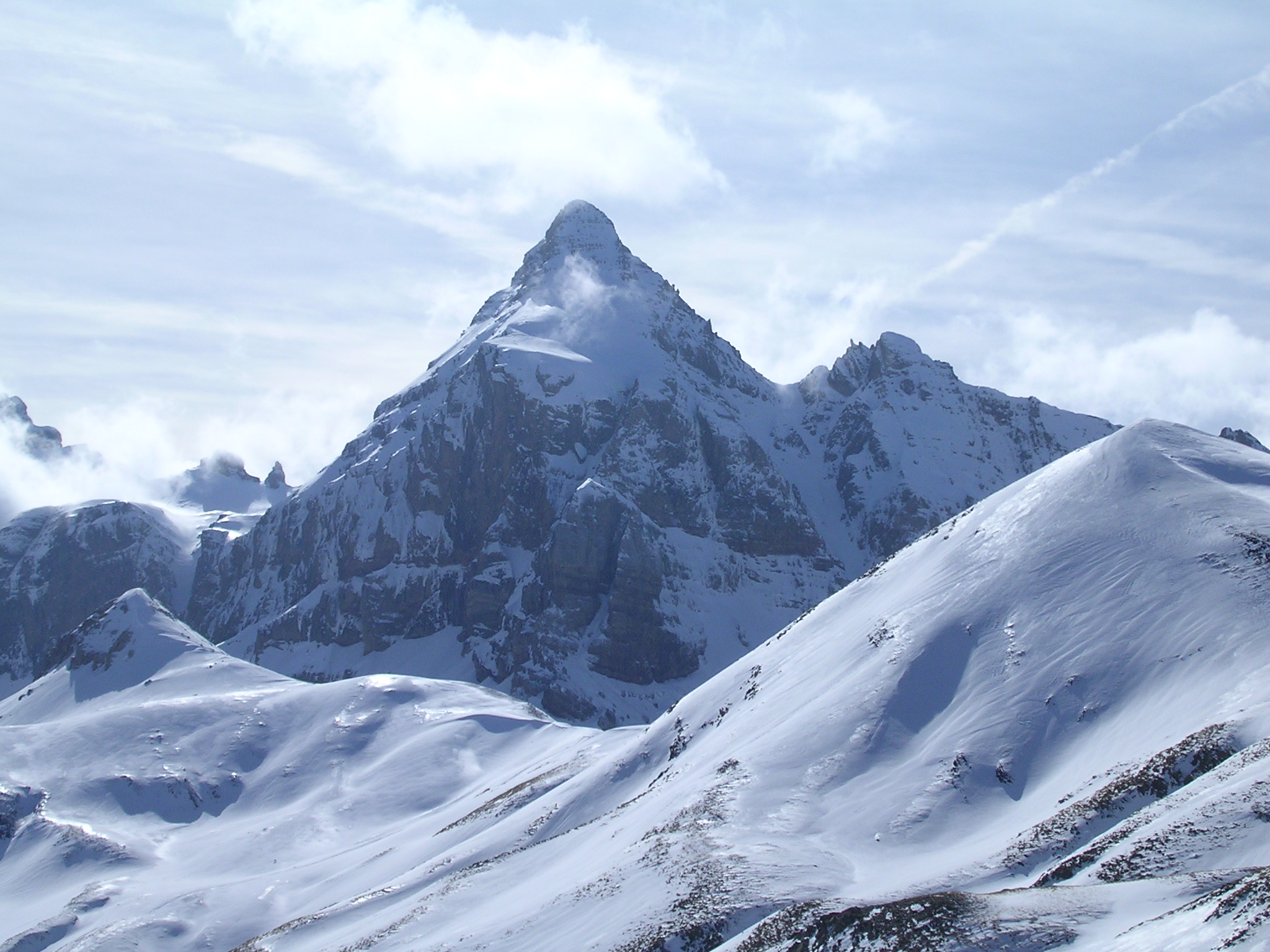

Highest point
- Elevation: 2,760 m (9,060 ft)
- Listing: List of mountains in Aragon
- Coordinates: 42°44′2″N 0°26′15″E

Geography
- Location within Pyrenees
- Location: Jacetania, Aragon, Spain
- Parent range: Pyrenees

Geology
- Mountain type: Karstic

Climbing
- First ascent: Unknown
- Easiest route: From Sabiñánigo, Sallent de Gállego or Canfranc

The Escarra Peak (Spanish: Punta Escarra) is a prominent mountain on the Spanish side of the Pyrenees, in the North of Jacetania comarca, in Aragon. The Escarra river has its sources beneath this peak.

This peak is part of a subrange known as Sierra de la Partacua located in an area of many high peaks.
