= Collarada =

Mountain peak in Spain

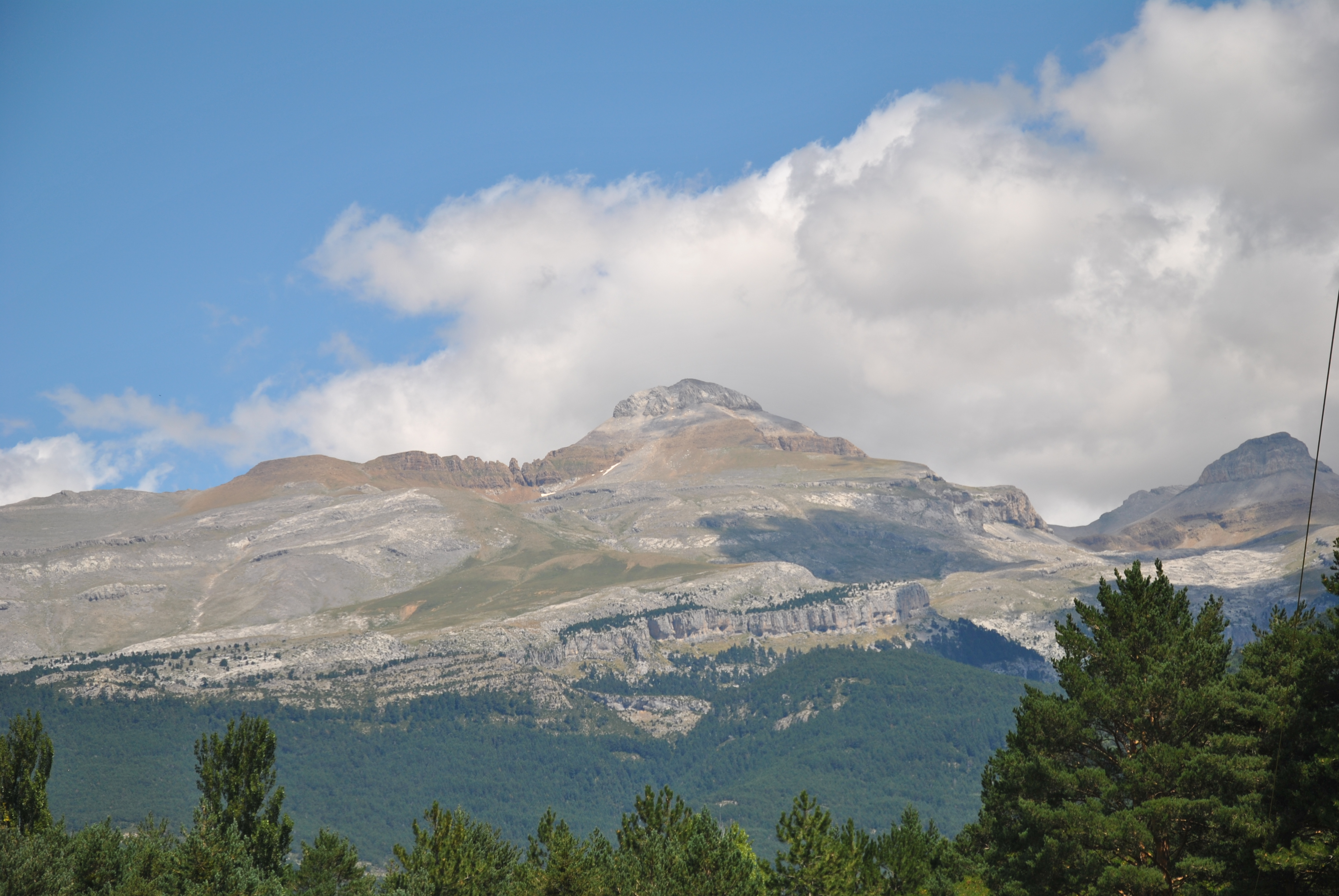

Highest point
- Elevation: 2,886 m (9,469 ft)
- Prominence: 800 m (2,600 ft)
- Listing: List of mountains in Aragon
- Coordinates: 42°40′N 00°30′E

Geography
- Location within Pyrenees
- Location: Jacetania, Aragon
- Parent range: Pyrenees

Climbing
- First ascent: Unknown
- Easiest route: From Villanúa

Collarada peak is a mountain in the western Pyrenees of Huesca, situated on the northeastern Aragon near the towns of Villanúa (to the south) and Canfranc (to the west). The peak is 2,886 meters AMSL high, being the highest summit in the Jacetania comarca of Aragon.

A great view of this mountain can be obtained from Larres, a village that gained life again after its castle dated 14th century got restored by the "Amigos del Serrablo".

== See also ==
- List of Pyrenean three-thousanders
