= Txamantxoia =

Mountain in the Pyrenees

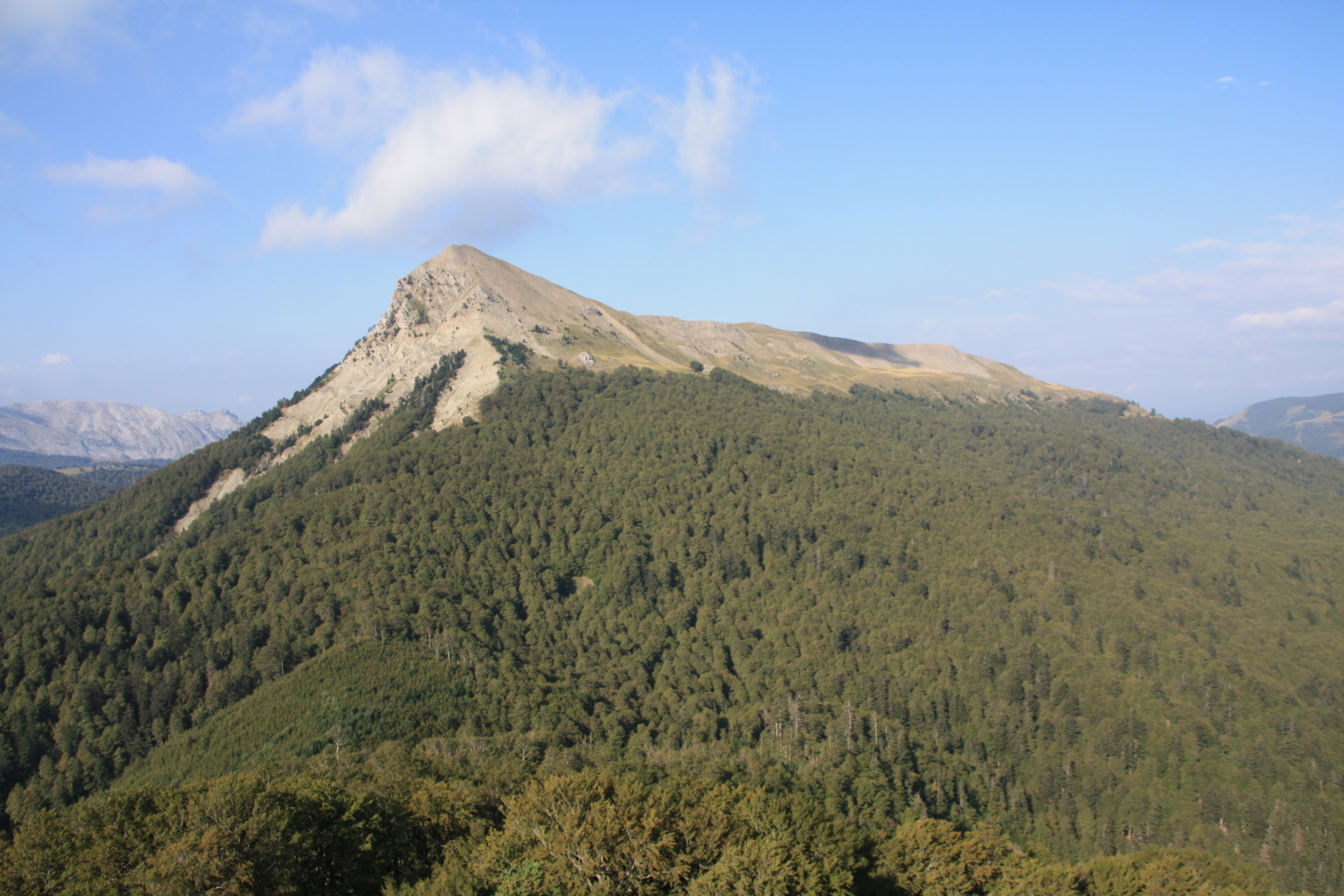
- View of Peña del Rey in Txamantxoia

Highest point
- Elevation: 1,945 m (6,381 ft)
- Prominence: 375 m (1,230 ft)
- Isolation: 3.59 km (2.23 mi) to Paquiza Linzola
- Coordinates: 42°54′12″N 00°48′56″W

Geography
- Location within Pyrenees
- Location: Jacetania (Aragon); Belagua (Navarre)
- Parent range: Pyrenees

Climbing
- First ascent: Unknown
- Easiest route: From Isaba

Txamantxoia or Maze (Spanish: Chamanchoya) (1,945 m) is a mountain in the Pyrenees. It is located between the Ansó Valley in Aragon and the Belagua Valley in Navarre, Spain.
