= Perdiguero =

Summit in the Pyrenees Mountains

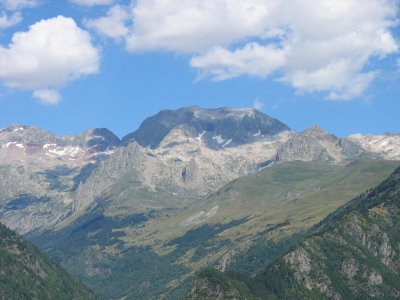
- Peak of Perdiguère, Lac du Portillon and ascending route

Highest point
- Elevation: 3,222 m (10,571 ft)
- Listing: List of Pyrenean three-thousanders
- Coordinates: 42°41′30″N 0°31′07″E

Geography
- Location within Pyrenees
- Location: France — Spain
- Région Communauté: Midi-Pyrénées; Aragon
- Département Province: Haute-Garonne; Huesca
- Parent range: Pyrenees

Climbing
- First ascent: 1817 by Friedrich Parrot and Pierre Barrau
- Easiest route: West ridge from the refuge of Portillon

Perdiguero is a Pyrenean summit, culminating at 3,222 m (10,571 ft), located on the French-Spanish border.

== Topography ==
Located between the Spanish municipality of Benasque and the commune of Oô, near Bagnères-de-Luchon in the Comminges between the department of Haute-Garonne and the province of Aragon, Perdiguero is the highest summit of Haute-Garonne before la pointe de Literole.

Lake Portillon lies at its foot.
