= Lac du Portillon =

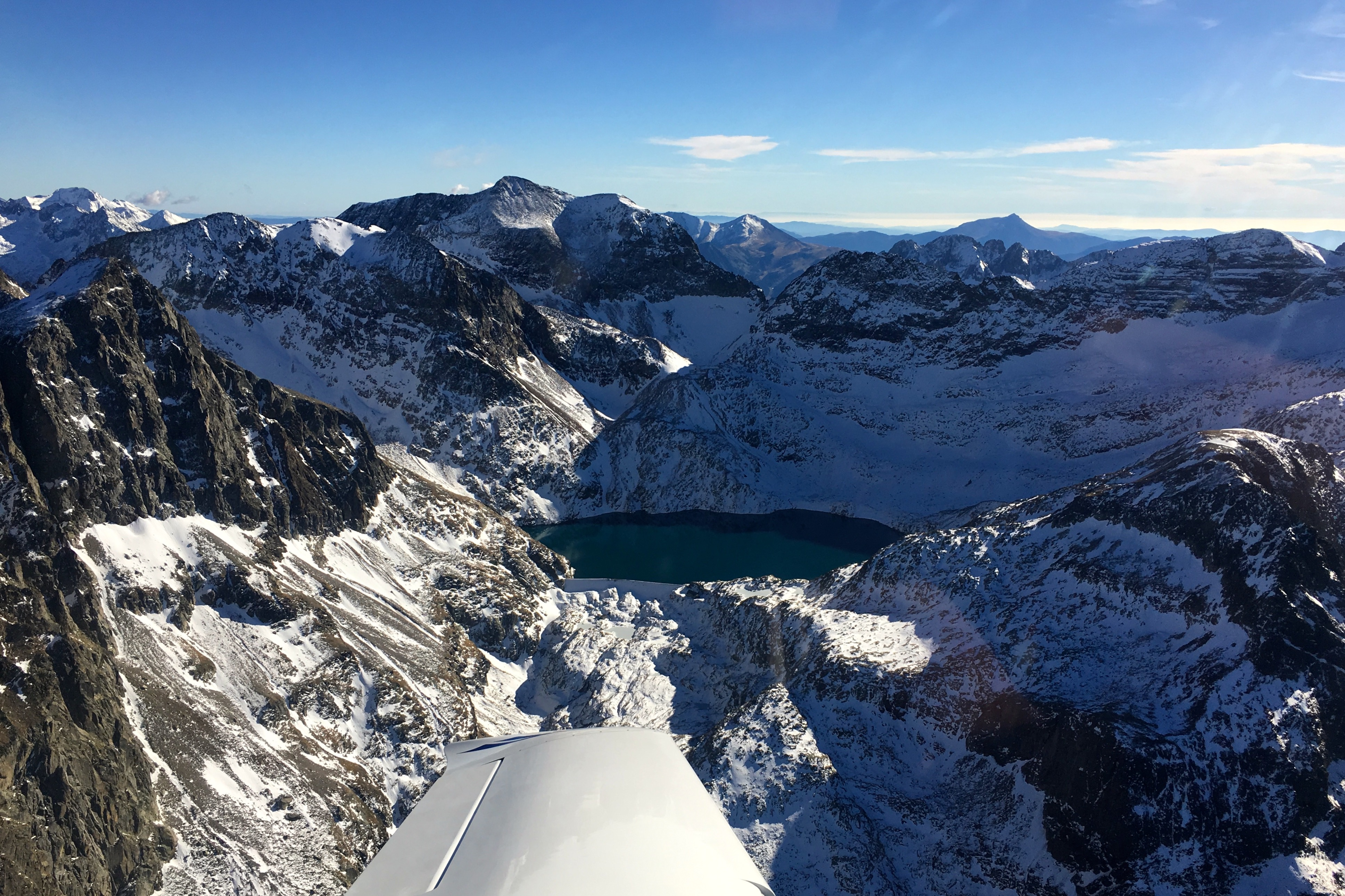

- Location within Haute-Garonne
- Location: Pyrénées, Haute-Garonne
- Coordinates: 42°42′3″N 0°30′32″E
- Type: reservoir
- Basin countries: France
- Surface area: 0.34 km^{2} (0.13 sq mi)
- Max. depth: 101 m (331 ft)
- Surface elevation: 2,580 m (8,460 ft)

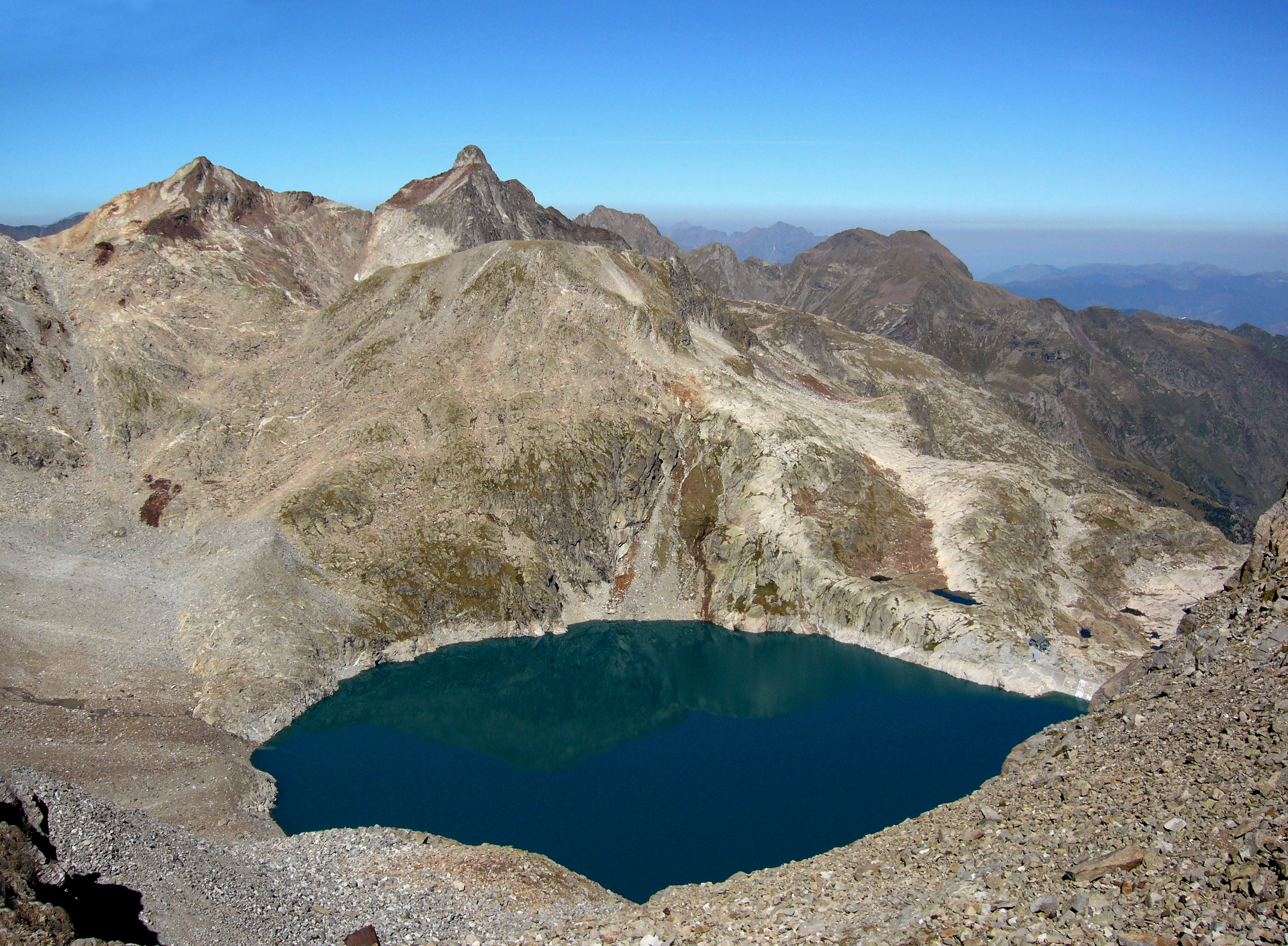
Pic des Spijeoles, Lac du Portillon

Lac du Portillon is a lake in Pyrénées, Haute-Garonne, France. At an elevation of 2580 m, its surface area is 0.34 km².

Perdiguero Peak rises above this lake.
