= Ibón de Plan =

- Basa de la Mora
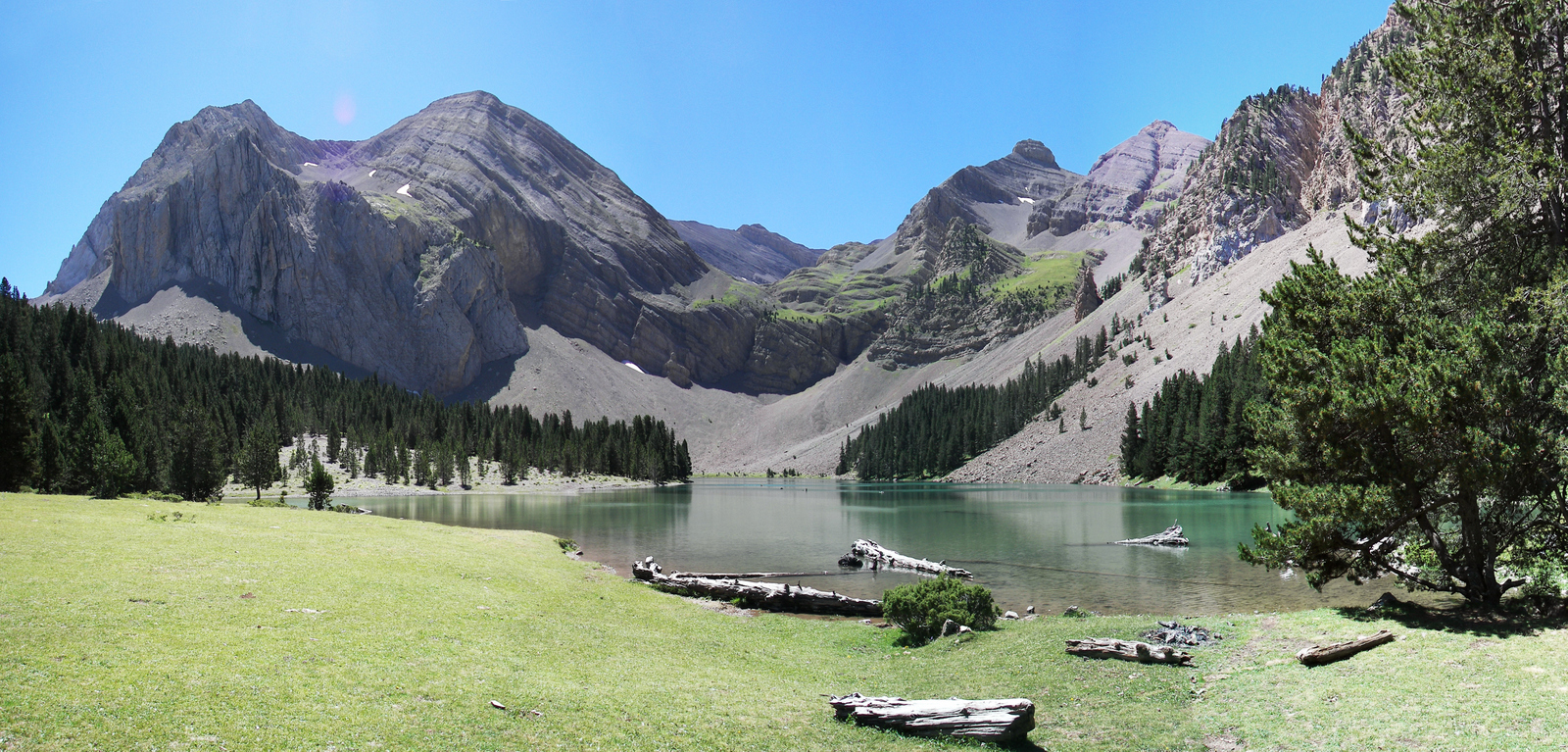
- Ibón de Plan.

- Location within Spain
- Location: Province of Huesca, northeastern Spain
- Coordinates: 42°32′46″N 0°19′30″E
- Type: lake
- Surface elevation: 1,910 metres (6,270 ft)

Ibón de Plan or Basa de la Mora is a lake in the Province of Huesca, northeastern Spain. It is not connected to any specific river, since the water that fills it originates in the snow and the ice accumulated in such altitudes. It lies at an elevation of 1,910 metres (6,270 ft) and has been described as a "conifer-flecked cirque".

The name of Basa de la Mora (or "Basa la Mora", in Aragonese language) comes from a local folktale according to which a Moorish princess drowned in this lake trying to escape from the Christian troops. According to this legend, during Saint John's Eve the princess can be seen, dancing over the surface, by any person of pure heart that washes its face with the water of the lake.
