= Pic de Sauvegarde =

Mountain on the France-Spain border

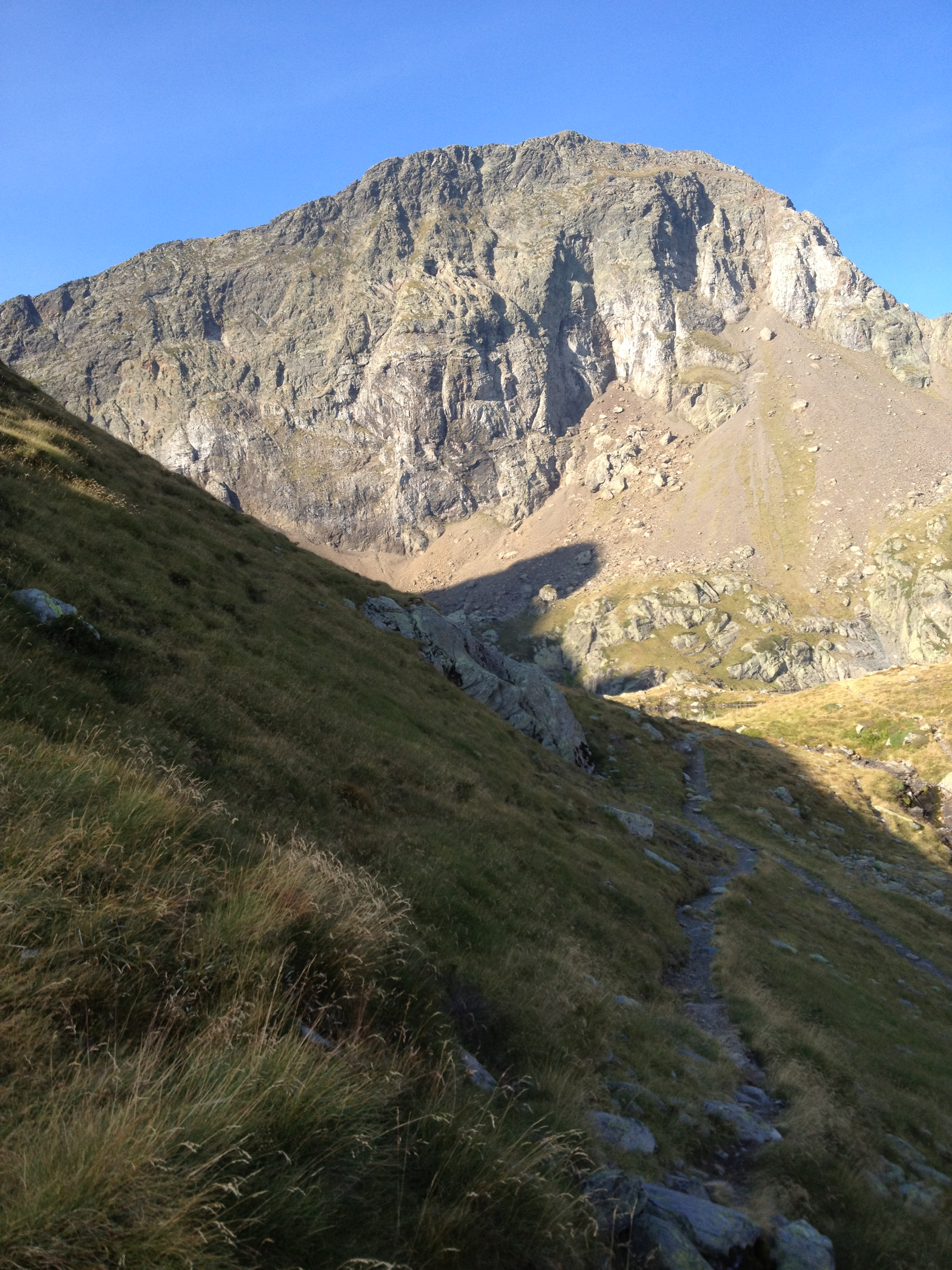

Highest point
- Elevation: 2,737 metres (8,980 ft)
- Coordinates: 42°41′41″N 0°37′51″E

Geography

Pic de Sauvegarde is a mountain in the Pyrenees on the border between France and Spain. It has an altitude of 2737 m.
