= Mallén =

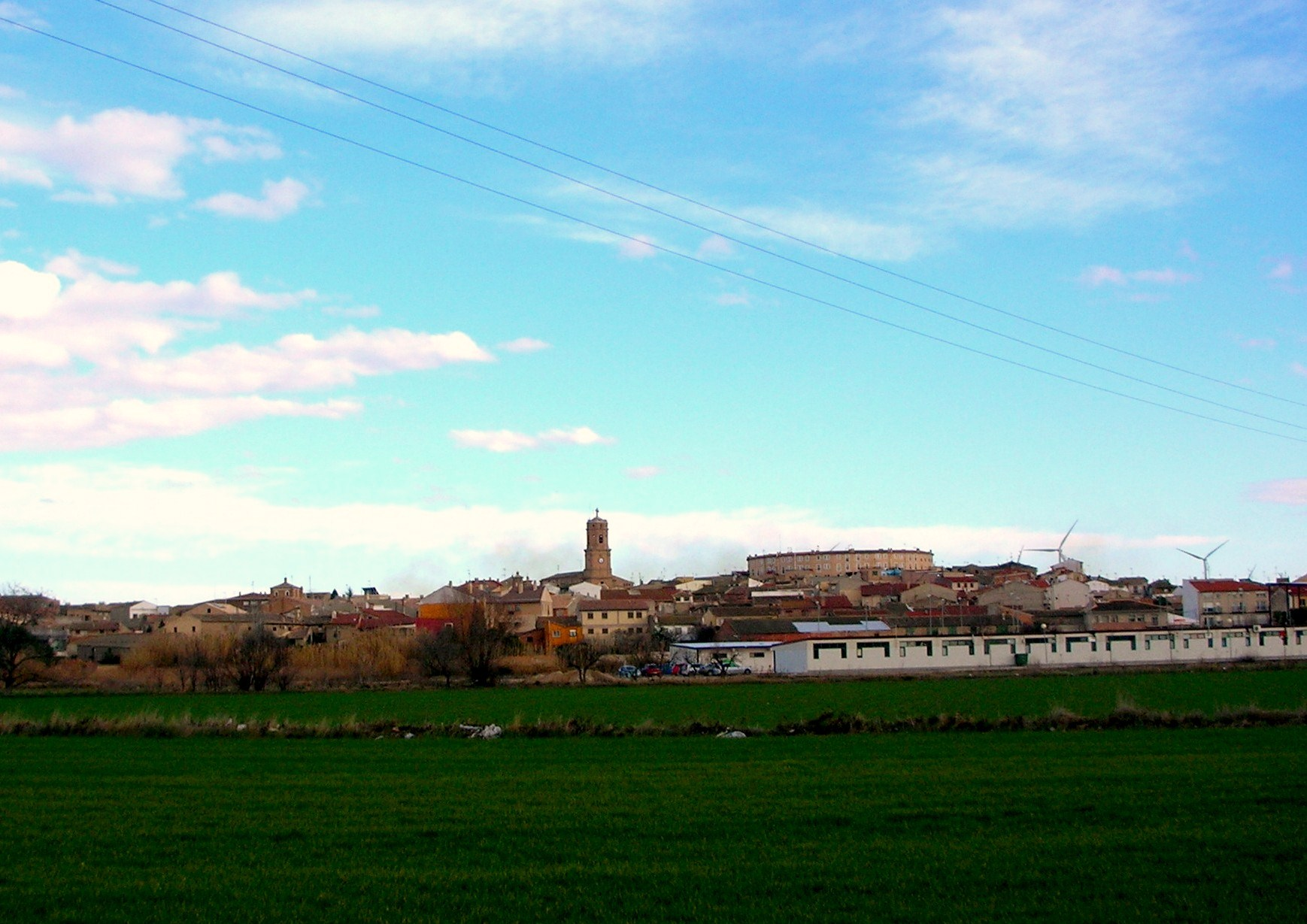
- View of Mallén from the west

- Flag Coat of arms

- Location in Spain
- Coordinates: 41°54′N 1°25′W
- Country: Spain
- Autonomous community: Aragon
- Province: Zaragoza
- Comarca: Campo de Borja

Area
  - Total: 37 km^{2} (14 sq mi)
- Elevation: 293 m (961 ft)

Population (2025-01-01)
  - Total: 2,951
- Time zone: UTC+1 (CET)
  - Summer (DST): UTC+2 (CEST)

Mallén is a municipality located in the province of Zaragoza, Aragon, Spain. According to the 2010 census the municipality has a population of 3074 inhabitants. Its postal code is 50550. Mallén is located close to Road N-232 in the Huecha River valley, near the Ebro on its right side. Belsinon is an ancient Celtiberian archeological site located in the Cerro del Convento hillock, formerly known as Mania or Manlia, near Mallén.

Santos González Roncal, one of the "Últimos de Filipinas" soldiers at the siege of Baler was born in Mallén in 1873. He was executed by the Guardia Civil at the beginning of the Spanish Civil War, on 8 September 1936.

== Tradition ==
According to a local tradition, the musicians of Mallén did not know how to play while walking during a religious procession. Thus a horse cart was provided and they played while they sat on the cart. Following this event, some aphorisms became part of the tradition of the surrounding towns.

Como los músicos de Mallén, que no sabían tocar andando Los músicos de Mallén, tocan poco y cobran bien Los músicos de Mallén, cobran poco y tocan bien	Like the musicians of Mallén who did not know how to play while walking The musicians of Mallén play little and are well-paid The musicians of Mallén ask for little pay and play well (local version)

== See also ==
- Campo de Borja
- Burrén and Burrena
- List of municipalities in Zaragoza
