= Ribera del Queiles =

Ribera de Queiles VdlT
- Wine region
- Ribera de Queiles VdlT in the region of Navarre and in the province of Zaragoza in Aragon
- Type: Vino de la Tierra
- Country: Spain

Ribera de Queiles is a Spanish geographical indication for Vino de la Tierra wines located in the province of Zaragoza (region of Aragon) and in the southern part of Navarre. Vino de la Tierra is one step below the mainstream Denominación de Origen indication on the Spanish wine quality ladder.

The area covered by this geographical indication comprises the municipalities of Grisel, Lituénigo, Los Fayos, Malón, Novallas, Santa Cruz de Moncayo, Tarazona, Torrellas and Vierlas in the province of Zaragoza, and the municipalities of Ablitas, Barillas, Cascante, Monteagudo, Murchante, and parts of Tudela and Tulebras in Navarre.

The area acquired its Vino de la Tierra status in 2003.

== Authorized grape varieties ==
Only the following red varieties are authorized:

- Cabernet Sauvignon, Merlot, Graciano, Tempranillo, Garnacha tinta and Syrah
