= Bat (heraldry) =

Heraldic symbol

Ratpenat (the Crest of the Bat), a heraldic symbol of the former Crown of Aragon.

Teruel city coat of arms.

The bat (also called the reremouse, reermouse, or rearmouse) is a heraldic symbol sometimes used as a charge, but most prominently used as a crest on or around the crown in municipal arms of the former Crown of Aragon—specifically in Valencia, Catalonia and the Balearic Islands.

== Origins ==
The heraldic use of the bat has its origins in the "royal dragon" crest (cimera reial) of the coat of arms of the Kings of Aragon. The royal helmet has a víbria, a traditional Catalan dragon, emerging from a crown as its crest. Although traditionally the dragon helmet is ascribed to king James I of Aragon (1208 – 1276), the winged dragon did not appear over the helmet until Peter IV of Aragon's reign (1319 – 1387). This crest was then transformed into a bat by municipalities.

There is also a legend of a bat that landed on the flag of King James I of Aragon in 1238, before he won a crucial battle against the Saracens in which he conquered Valencia for his kingdom. In another legend, a bat landed on his tent; James I ordered it to be killed but it was not; later, the bat alerted the king to the Saracens’ surprise night raid. Another version has it that bats’ nighttime routines inspired James I to attack the Saracens at night. Or perhaps a bat flew in front of him as he entered Valencia after capturing it. In any case, the bat, formerly a sign of bad luck, became a symbol of good fortune. However, original documents state that the animal was a swallow and not a bat.

The heraldic bat of Albacete has a different origin. It comes from the transformation over time of two "winged hands", the heraldic emblem of the lords of Villena.

Because bats eat mosquitos, a notable pest in these regions of Spain, some authors propose that bats on crests honor this ecological role in the local food chain.

== The bat in civic heraldry ==
The coats of arms of certain cities in eastern Spain, like Valencia, Palma, Mallorca and Fraga have the bat over the shield. Some smaller towns, like Catarroja and Novallas, also use this symbol.

Formerly the Barcelona city coat of arms had a bat crowning it as well, but the bat was removed at the beginning of the 20th century for unknown reasons. The city of Teruel used to have the bat surmounting the coat of arms' crown. There the bat represents a commemoration of the role of this city in the conquest of Valencia. The bat now rests just below the crown in Teruel's seal.

While the use of the bat as a heraldic symbol is prevalent in the territories of the former Crown of Aragon it is rarely used elsewhere. However, it can be found in a few places, including in the coats of arms of the city of Albacete in Spain, the town of Montchauvet, Yvelines in France, Fiefbergen in Schleswig-Holstein, Germany and the former Borough of Brecknock and historic county of Brecknockshire in Wales, UK. Outside of Europe, the coat of arms of Santa Fe de Antioquia, Colombia includes multiple bats; it was granted to the town in 1545 by Charles I of Castile and Aragon and his mother, Joanna of Castile.

Bat is used in coat of arms of Gmina Piątnica.

== Other uses ==
Based on the heraldic symbol of their city, certain Spanish association football club badges, like Albacete Balompié, CD Alcoyano, Levante UD and Valencia CF, have a bat on them. The oldest badge of FC Barcelona used between 1899 and 1910 had a small bat crowning it as well. Valencia FC first used the bat on its badge from its foundation in 1919. DC Comics has raised suits against Valencia FC with the European Union Intellectual Property Office in 2013 and 2019, claiming commonality with the Batman logo, but these have not been successful.

The Burgee of the Royal Valencia Yacht Club (Reial Club Nàutic de València) displays a bat on a golden field in its center.

Lo Rat Penat, a political organization based in Valencia in 1878, was named after the heraldic bat. Established by Constantí Llombart, Teodor Llorente and Fèlix Pizcueta, its aim was originally to foster a movement similar to the Catalan Renaixença in the region of Valencia.

The No. 9 Squadron RAF adopted the bat badge in 1917 along with the Latin motto Per Noctem Volamus "We fly through the night". The badge was approved by King Edward VIII in November 1936.

== Gallery ==
Armorial Achievement of the Wakefield Baronetcy of Kendal

Valencia city's arms

Present-day arms of Palma de Mallorca

Old coat of arms of Novallas, Aragon

Teruel city coat of arms

Coat of arms of Fraga

Coat of arms of Catarroja

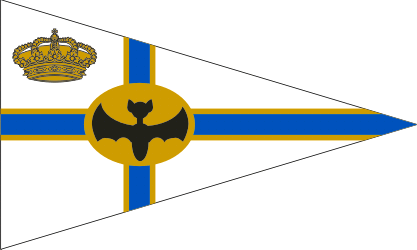
Burgee of the Royal Valencia Yacht Club

Coat of arms of Munera

Coat of arms of Novallas

Coat of arms of Emperador

Coat of arms of the city of Albacete

Coat of arms of the Province of Albacete

Coat of arms of Montchauvet, France

Coat of arms of Fiefbergen, Germany

Coat of arms of Pácora, Colombia

Coat of arms of Santa Fe de Antioquia, Colombia

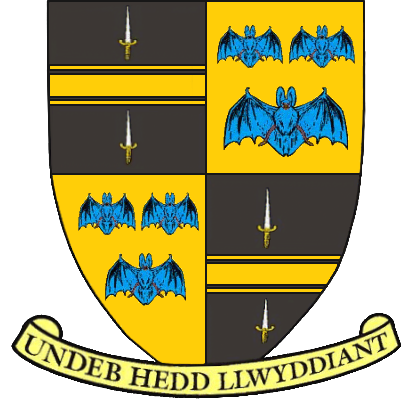
Coat of arms of the historic county of Brecknockshire, Wales

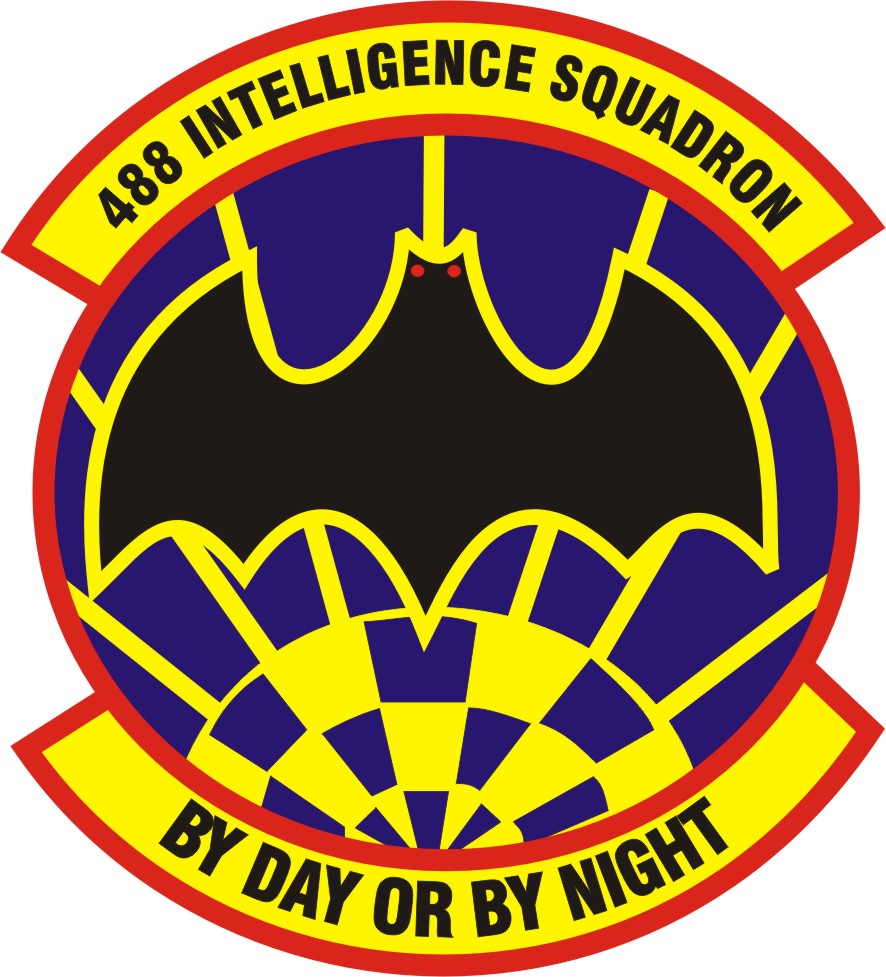
488 Intelligence Squadron patch

Emblem of the Spetsnaz GRU, special forces of GRU

Former arms of Palma de Mallorca with the winged dragon crown known as Cimera de la Festa de l'Estendard without the helmet. 17th century

Barcelona coat of arms (17th-18th Centuries) with the Royal Winged Dragon (Vibra) crown and the helmet

c.1790-1870 coat of arms already displaying a bat instead of a dragon on top of the helmet

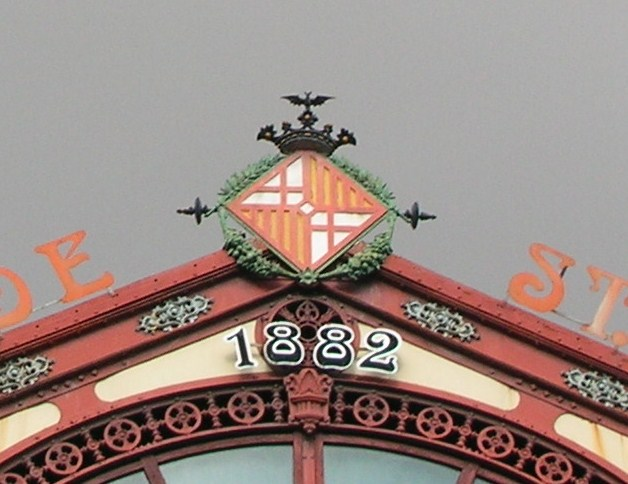
Late 19th century Barcelona coat of arms at Mercat de Sant Antoni, Barcelona

Coat of arms of Tibás Canton, Costa Rica

Coat of arms of Piątnica

== See also ==
- Dragon
- Dragons in Catalan mythology
- Catalan symbols
- James I of Aragon
- Crown of Aragon
