= Alcalá de Moncayo =

Alcalá de Moncayo, Spain
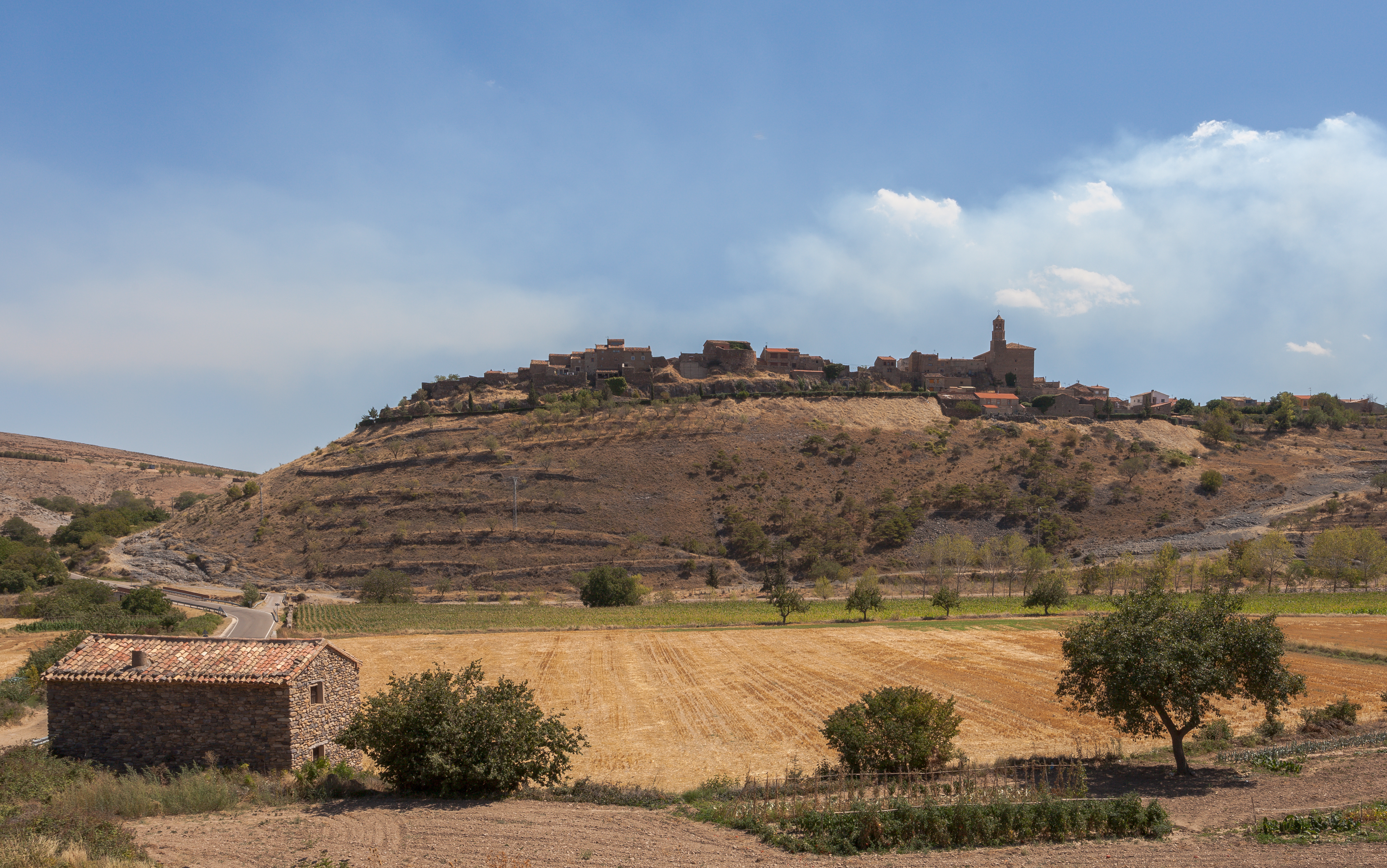

- Flag Coat of arms

- Location within Aragon Location within Spain Location within Europe
- Country: Spain
- Autonomous community: Aragon
- Province: Zaragoza
- Comarca: Tarazona y el Moncayo

Government
  - Alcalde: Idoia Sanchez Peña

Area
  - Total: 13.69 km^{2} (5.29 sq mi)
- Elevation: 766 m (2,513 ft)

Population (2025-01-01)
  - Total: 147
  - Density: 10.7/km^{2} (27.8/sq mi)
- Time zone: UTC+1 (CET)
  - Summer (DST): UTC+2 (CEST)

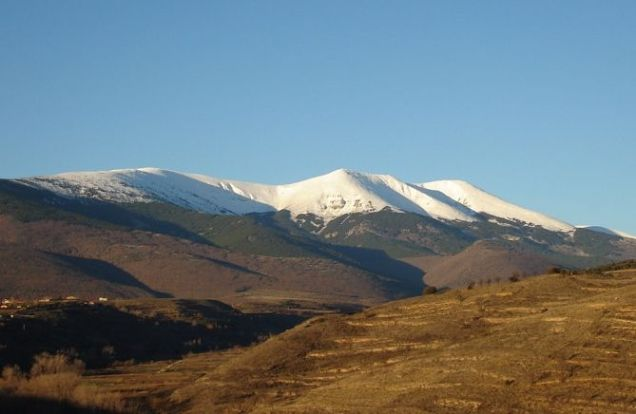
The Moncayo Massif seen from Alcalá de Moncayo

Alcalá de Moncayo is a municipality located in the province of Zaragoza, Aragon, Spain. According to the 2004 census (INE), the municipality has a population of 144 inhabitants.

== See also ==
- List of municipalities in Zaragoza
