= Vozmediano =

- Municipality
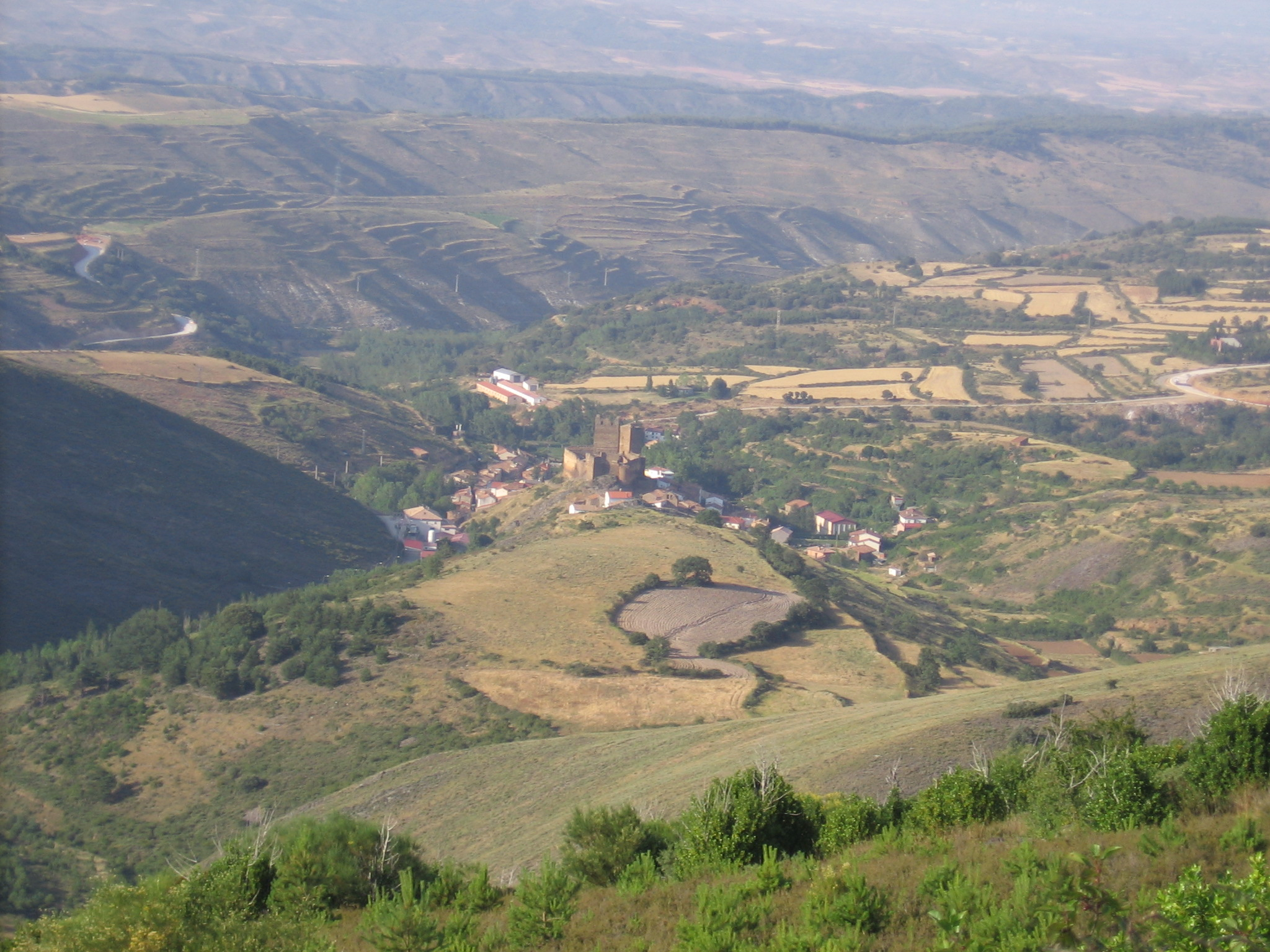
- View from Moncayo

- Location in Spain. Vozmediano (Spain)
- Coordinates: 41.817°N 1.850°W
- Country: Spain
- Autonomous community: Castile and León
- Province: Soria
- Municipality: Vozmediano

Area
  - Total: 16.61 km^{2} (6.41 sq mi)
- Elevation: 893 m (2,930 ft)

Population (2025-01-01)
  - Total: 29
  - Density: 1.7/km^{2} (4.5/sq mi)
- Time zone: UTC+1 (CET)
  - Summer (DST): UTC+2 (CEST)
- Website: Official website

Vozmediano is a municipality located in the province of Soria, Castile and León, Spain. According to the 2004 census (INE), the municipality had a population of 45 inhabitants. The Queiles arises here.
