= Vera de Moncayo =

Coordinates: 41°49′N 1°41′W

- municipality
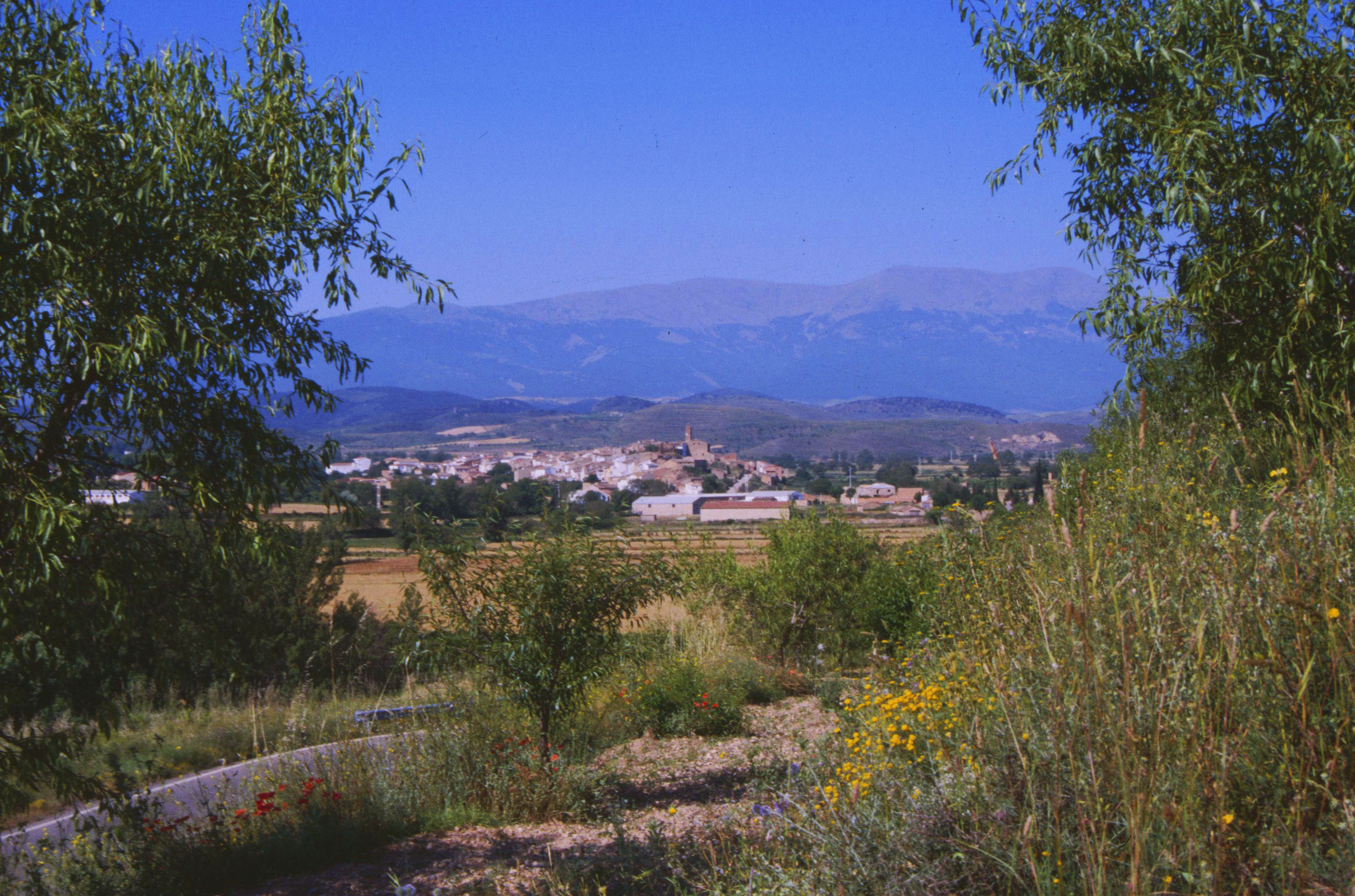
- View of Vera de Moncayo

- Flag Coat of arms
- Interactive map of Vera de Moncayo
- Country: Spain
- Autonomous community: Aragon
- Province: Zaragoza
- Comarca: Tarazona y el Moncayo

Area
  - Total: 27.52 km^{2} (10.63 sq mi)
- Elevation: 631 m (2,070 ft)

Population (2025-01-01)
  - Total: 317
  - Density: 11.5/km^{2} (29.8/sq mi)
- Time zone: UTC+1 (CET)
  - Summer (DST): UTC+2 (CEST)

Vera de Moncayo is a municipality located in the province of Zaragoza, Aragon, Spain. According to the 2004 census (INE), the municipality has a population of 432 inhabitants.

== See also ==
- List of municipalities in Zaragoza
