= Torrellas =

Coordinates: 41°54′N 1°46′W

- municipality
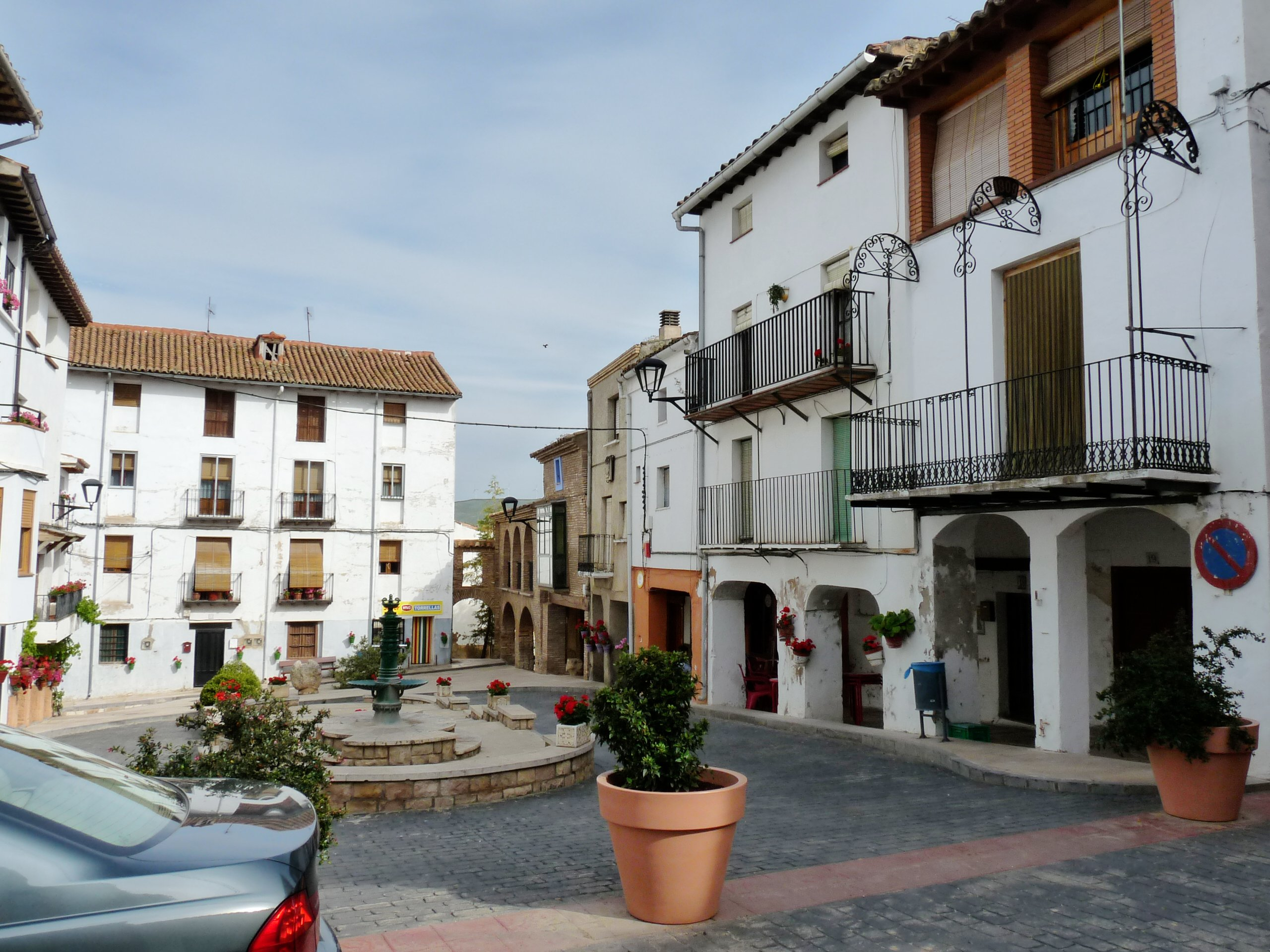
- View of Torrellas

- Flag Coat of arms
- Interactive map of Torrellas
- Country: Spain
- Autonomous community: Aragon
- Province: Zaragoza
- Comarca: Tarazona y el Moncayo

Area
  - Total: 2 km^{2} (0.77 sq mi)

Population (2025-01-01)
  - Total: 249
  - Density: 120/km^{2} (320/sq mi)
- Time zone: UTC+1 (CET)
  - Summer (DST): UTC+2 (CEST)

Torrellas is a municipality located in the province of Zaragoza, Aragon, Spain. According to the 2004 census (INE), the municipality has a population of 312 inhabitants.

== Geography ==
Torrellas is located in the northwest of the province of Zaragoza in the vicinity of the autonomous communities of Castile and Leon, La Rioja and Navarre.

Located 570 meters above sea level, it has an area of 2.5 km² and the town is located on the left bank of the Queiles River.

The nearest main cities are Zaragoza and Logroño at 90 km, Soria at 60 km, Tudela at 20 km and Tarazona at 3 km. The Camino de Santiago of Soria, also called Castilian-Aragonese, passes through the town.

== Climate ==
Torrellas has a continental Mediterranean climate, cold in winter and hot in summer.

== See also ==
- List of municipalities in Zaragoza
