= Cueva de Ágreda =

- Municipality
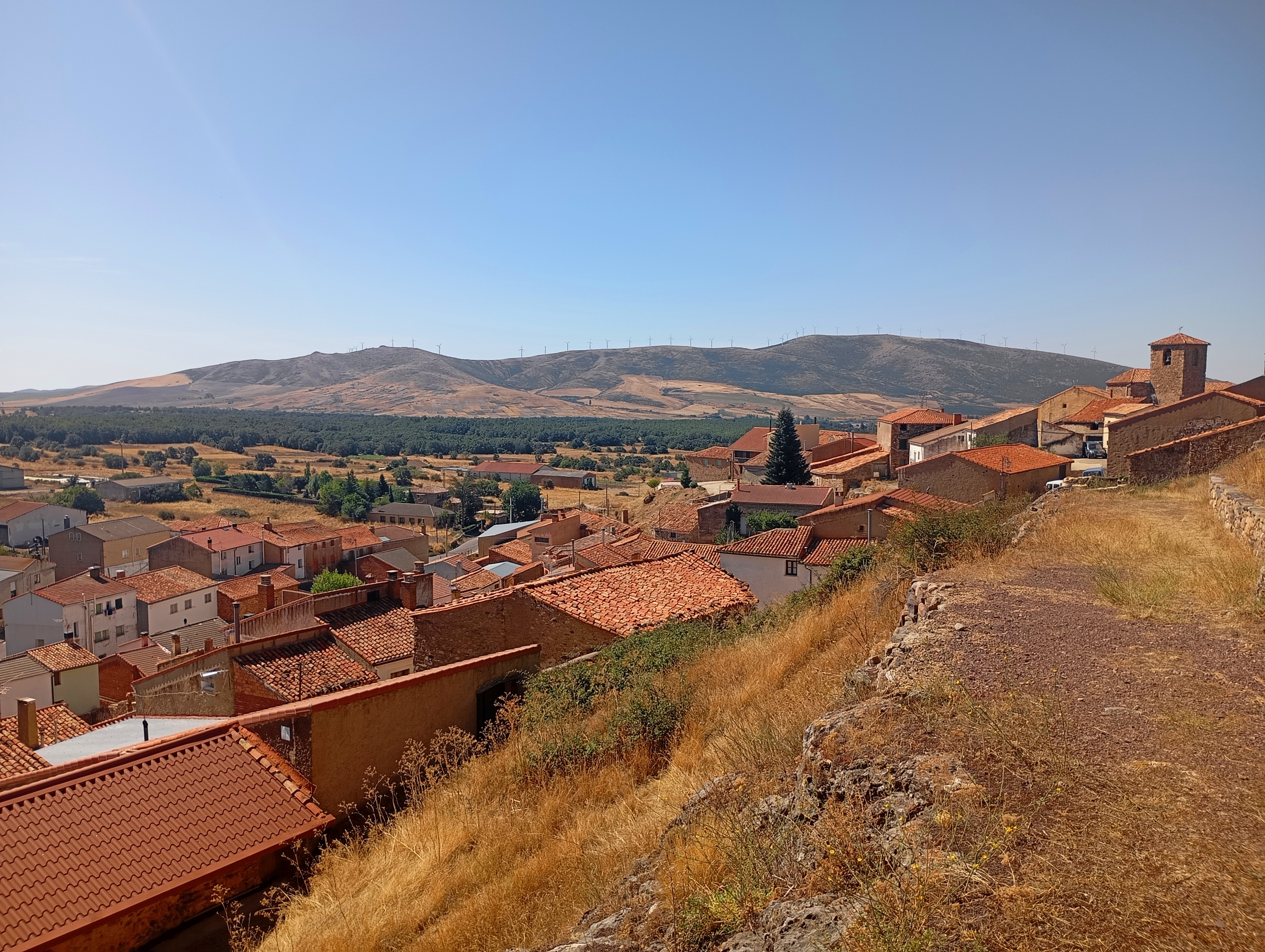

- Flag Coat of arms

- Location of Cueva de Ágreda in Soria Province

- Location in Spain. Cueva de Ágreda (Spain)
- Country: Spain
- Autonomous community: Castile and León
- Province: Soria
- Municipality: Cueva de Ágreda

Area
  - Total: 29 km^{2} (11 sq mi)
- Elevation: 1,301 m (4,268 ft)

Population (2025-01-01)
  - Total: 67
  - Density: 2.3/km^{2} (6.0/sq mi)
- Time zone: UTC+1 (CET)
  - Summer (DST): UTC+2 (CEST)
- Website: Official website

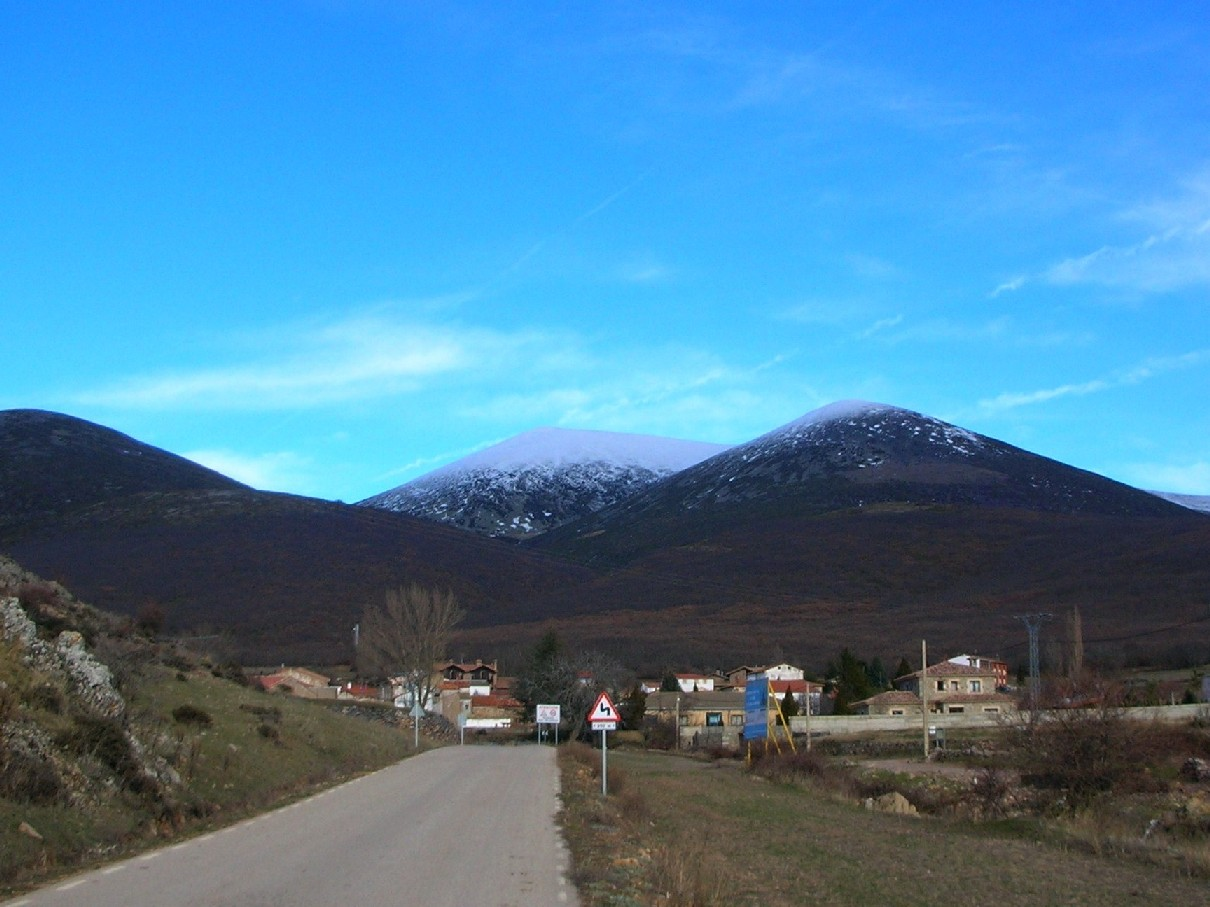
View of Cueva de Ágreda town with the massive summits of the Moncayo Massif in the background

Cueva de Ágreda is a municipality located in the province of Soria, Castile and León, Spain. According to the 2004 census (INE), the municipality has a population of 95 inhabitants.

The nearest main town is Ólvega.
