= Tarazona y el Moncayo =

- Comarca
- Interactive map of Tarazona y el Moncayo
- Coordinates: 41°54′20″N 1°43′16″W
- Country: Spain
- Autonomous community: Aragon
- Province: Zaragoza
- Capital: Tarazona
- Municipalities: List: See text

Area
  - Total: 452.4 km^{2} (174.7 sq mi)

Population
  - Total: 14,287
  - Density: 31.58/km^{2} (81.79/sq mi)
- Time zone: UTC+1 (CET)
  - Summer (DST): UTC+2 (CEST)
- Largest municipality: Tarazona

Tarazona y el Moncayo is a comarca in the Province of Zaragoza, within the Aragon region of northeastern Spain.

== Geography ==
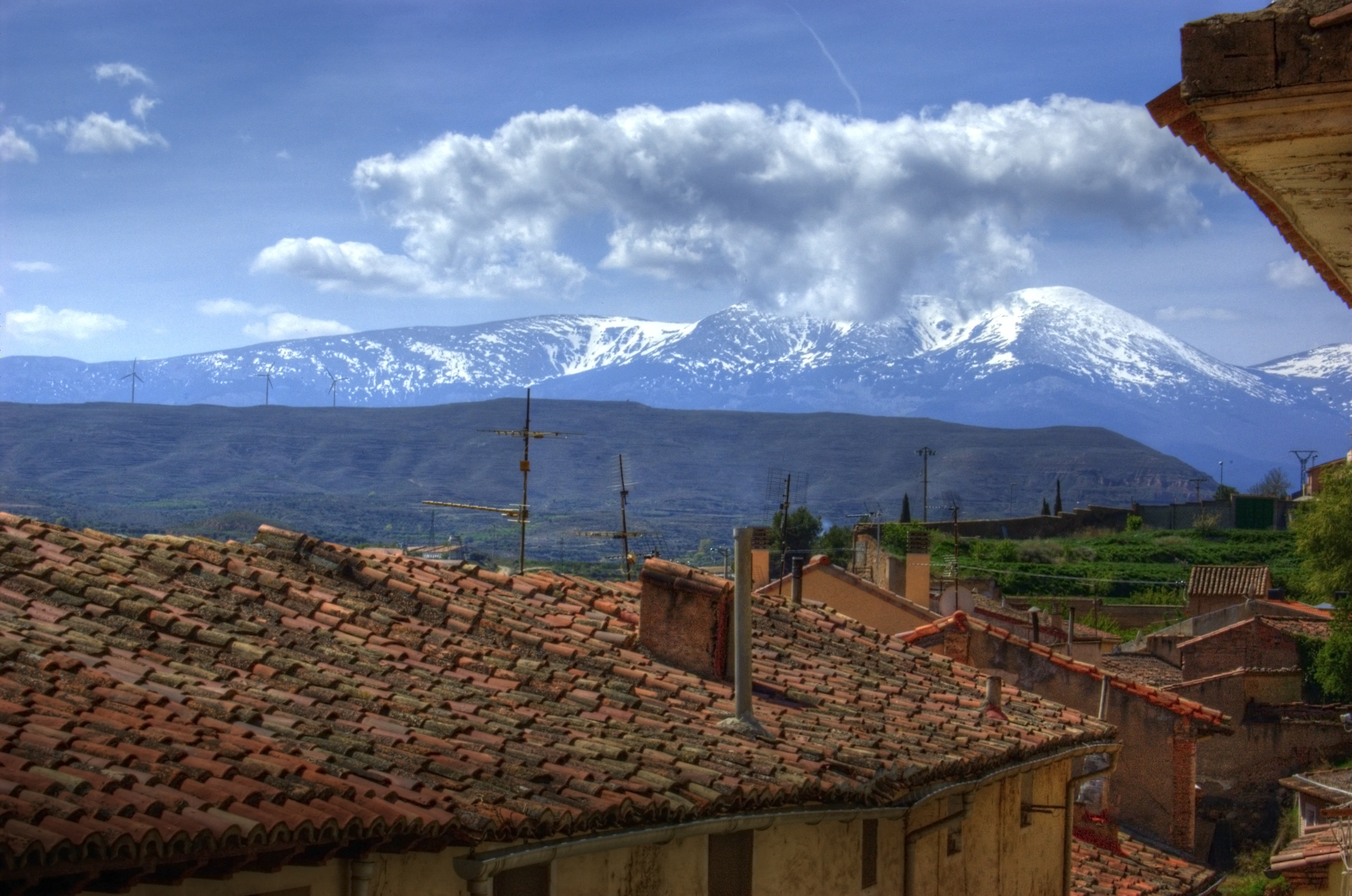
The Moncayo Massif, seen from Tarazona.

Tarazona is the capital of and most important city in the Comarca of Tarazona y el Moncayo.

The comarca is located at the western side of Aragon, bordering the autonomous community of Navarre, the Province of Soria in Castile and León, and the autonomous community and province of La Rioja.

The majestic Moncayo Massif dominates the landscape and gives its name to the comarca. Its highest summit is the highest point in the 500 km long Sistema Ibérico range.

=== Municipalities ===
Municipalities within the Comarca of Tarazona y el Moncayo include:

- Alcalá de Moncayo
- Añón de Moncayo
- El Buste
- Los Fayos
- Grisel
- Litago
- Lituénigo
- Malón
- Novallas
- San Martín de la Virgen de Moncayo
- Santa Cruz de Moncayo
- Tarazona
- Torrellas
- Trasmoz
- Vera de Moncayo
- Vierlas

== See also ==
- Moncayo Massif
- Comarcas of Aragon

== Climate ==
The climate is dry, continental, with marked seasonal changes, the summers are pleasant and relatively short compared with the long cold winters.
