= San Martín de la Virgen de Moncayo =

Coordinates: 41°50′N 1°47′W

San Martín de la Virgen de Moncayo, Spain
- Flag Coat of arms
- Interactive map of San Martín de la Virgen de Moncayo, Spain
- Country: Spain
- Autonomous community: Aragon
- Province: Zaragoza
- Comarca: Tarazona y el Moncayo

Area
  - Total: 5.48 km^{2} (2.12 sq mi)
- Elevation: 552 m (1,811 ft)

Population (2025-01-01)
  - Total: 266
  - Density: 48.5/km^{2} (126/sq mi)
- Time zone: UTC+1 (CET)
  - Summer (DST): UTC+2 (CEST)

San Martín de la Virgen de Moncayo is a municipality located in the province of Zaragoza, Aragon, Spain. According to the 2004 census (INE), the municipality has a population of 291 inhabitants.

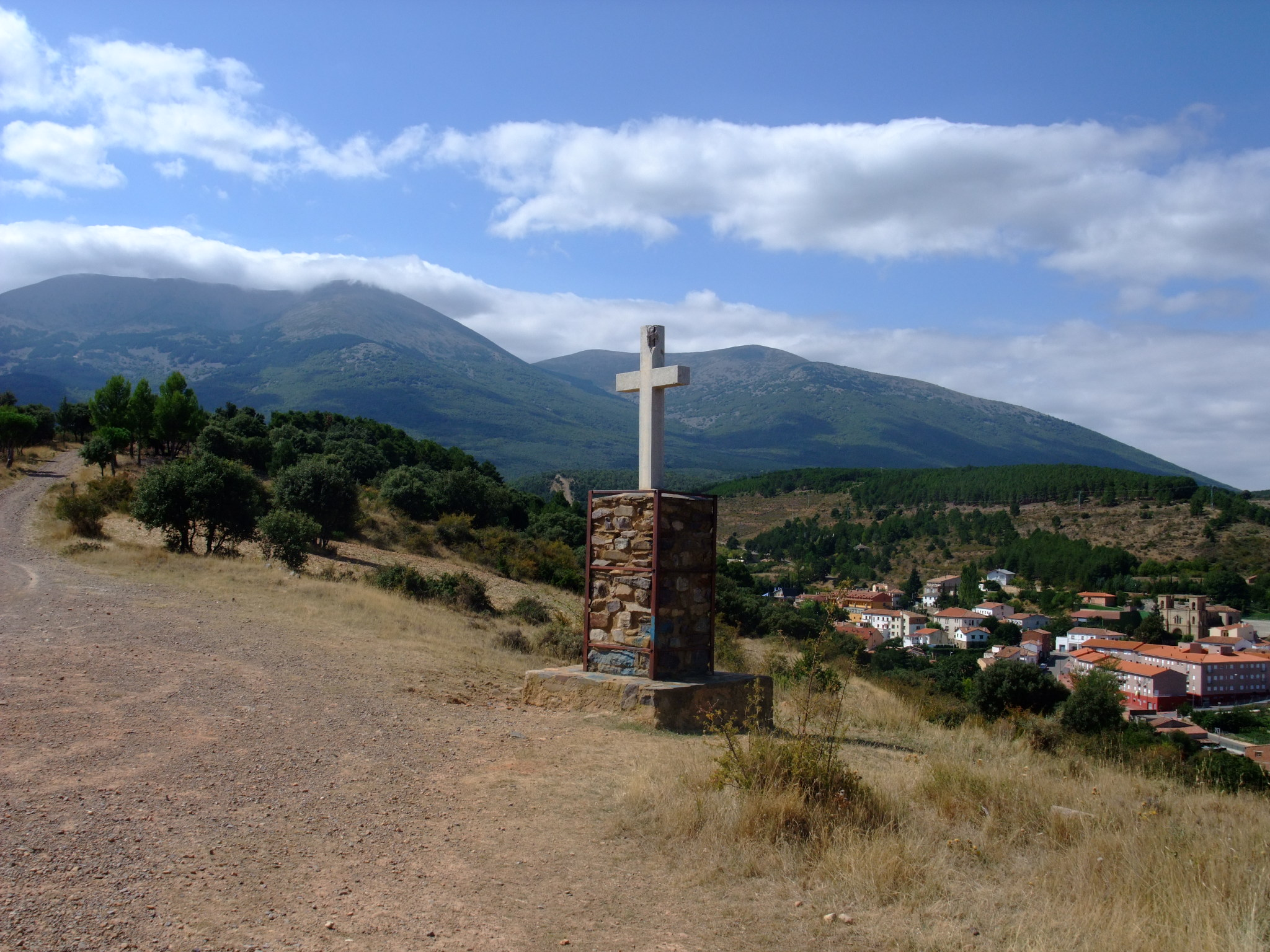
San Martín de la Virgen de Moncayo from the North-East

== See also ==
- Moncayo Massif
- List of municipalities in Zaragoza
