= Añón de Moncayo =

- Municipality
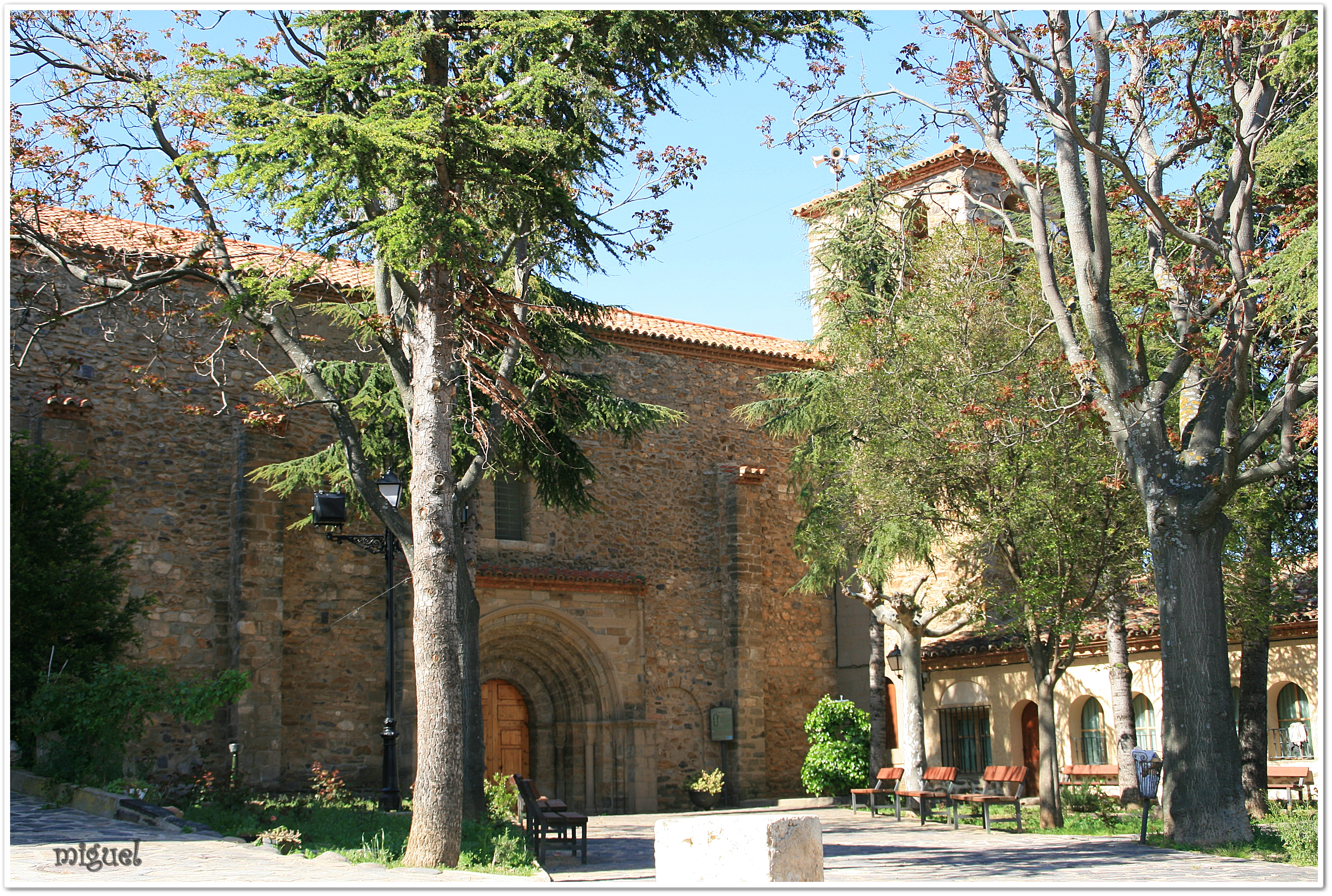

- Coat of arms

- Location within Aragon Location within Spain Location within Europe
- Country: Spain
- Autonomous community: Aragon
- Province: Zaragoza
- Comarca: Tarazona y el Moncayo

Area
  - Total: 64.33 km^{2} (24.84 sq mi)
- Elevation: 836 m (2,743 ft)

Population (2025-01-01)
  - Total: 207
  - Density: 3.22/km^{2} (8.33/sq mi)
- Time zone: UTC+1 (CET)
  - Summer (DST): UTC+2 (CEST)

Añón de Moncayo (Until 1991 it was called Añón) is a municipality located in the province of Zaragoza, Aragon, Spain. According to the 2004 census (INE), the municipality has a population of 263 inhabitants.

== See also ==
- List of municipalities in Zaragoza
