= Novallas =

Novallas, Spain
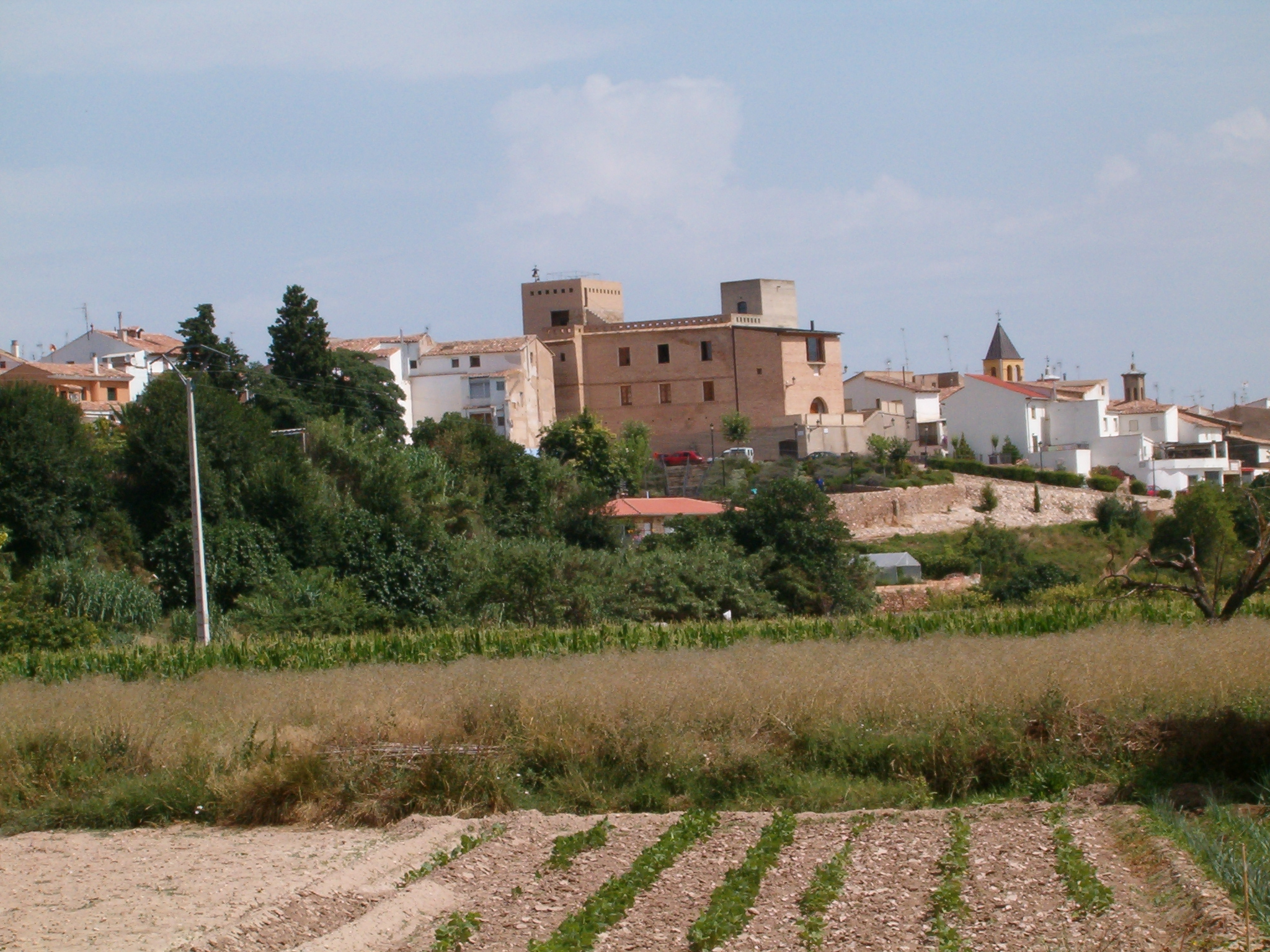

- Flag Coat of arms

- Location within Aragon Location within Spain Location within Europe
- Country: Spain
- Autonomous community: Aragon
- Province: Zaragoza
- Comarca: Tarazona y el Moncayo

Area
  - Total: 11 km^{2} (4.2 sq mi)
- Elevation: 425 m (1,394 ft)

Population (2025-01-01)
  - Total: 859
  - Density: 78/km^{2} (200/sq mi)
- Time zone: UTC+1 (CET)
  - Summer (DST): UTC+2 (CEST)

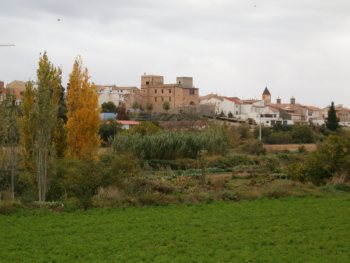
Novallas in Autumn from Queiles valley

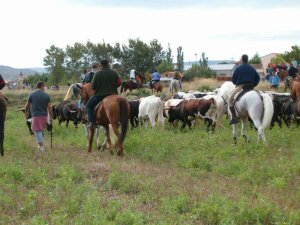
Encierro Andando in Novallas

Novallas is a municipality located in the province of Zaragoza, Aragon, Spain. It belongs to the "comarca" (county) of Tarazona y el Moncayo. According to the 2004 census (INE), the municipality has a population of 807 inhabitants.

== Geography ==
Location: Situated on the left bank of Queiles to NO of Zaragoza, neighbouring Navarra. Its relief is fairly flat with some inclination to the west of its territory. It is about 100 km far from Soria, Pamplona, Logroño and Zaragoza, 15 km from Tudela and 6 km from Tarazona. Moncayo mountain is 15 km to the south.

Routes of access: Road N-121 Tarazona - Tudela.

Climate: Continental Mediterranean.

== Population ==
Historical evolution of the Town:

1495: 8 Christian fires and 23 Moorish.
1543: 31 fires.
1610: 80 houses
1646: 36 fires.
1713: 27 neighbours.
1722: 18 neighbours.
1787: 18 neighbours.
1797: 58 neighbours.
1857: 1,077 inhabitants.
1877: 1,216 inhabitants.
1900: 1,504 inhabitants.
1910: 1,503 inhabitants.
1920: 1,586 inhabitants.
1930: 1,591 inhabitants.
1940: 1,535 inhabitants.
1950: 1,686 inhabitants.
1960: 1,368 inhabitants.
1965: 1,264 inhabitants.
1970: 1,138 inhabitants.
1980: 936 inhabitants.
1991: 783 inhabitants.
1996: 773 inhabitants.
2000: 731 inhabitants.
2003: 815 inhabitants.
2006: 818 inhabitants.
2007: 875 inhabitants.

In recent years, it has stopped the trend of depopulation that had begun in the 60's. This has been due to immigration, especially Romanians and Equatorians, and the big price of housing in nearby places like Tarazona, that makes people to live in Novallas, with lower prices.

== Government and administration ==
Novallas has its own council with seven counselors.

== Economy ==
The main economic activity is agriculture, but gradually this activity has become less important compared with building, industry and services. The land is broken into a smallholding. It belongs to people who have received as inheritance and who are not farmers or are already retired. There are few young farmers. Almost all the land of the town is irrigated. The irrigation in areas near the river Queiles is more intensive. The main crops are olives, almonds, and cereal. Most of the orchards are used for own consumption, although there is some cultivation of fruit, tomato or other vegetables such as kale. Wine was important in the past, but now its existence is testimonial as Novallas does not belong to any of Protected Denomination of Origin nearby. Asparagus, of great importance in recent decades of the last century, is no longer one of the main crops. Despite belonging to PDO of Navarre asparagus, competition from countries with cheaper labor has been falling prices and that the presence of this crop in Novallas is testimonial.

About livestock, there are some poultry farms, although this activity has declined in recent years. There are also some pig farms. The sheep farming remains important and there are still several flocks. Somer year ago, every family had a few sheep and goats that met in a communal farmyard called "la vicera" to form a communal herd.

As for craft work and industry, basketry was traditional in Novallas and there were several factories and workshops devoted to it, but this activity has already been abandoned. The largest factory that currently exists is engaged in the manufacture of kitchen and bathroom furniture. Other activities include carpentry, metal works, and vehicle repair. The council just has built an industrial park, still to be occupied.

An important amount of Novallers are working in industry and services in larger towns nearby, such as Tarazona, Tudela and Zaragoza or its suburbs.

Building has always had some importance. There have been several gangs of masons and now there are one or two companies engaged in construction.

== Media ==
The cultural magazine "La Toque" is the only periodical in the village. It is written by its volunteer inhabitants and promoted by the council.

== History ==
The Roman era had in this part of Queiles valley a privileged place to settle their farms or villae, which are being studied by several researchers. Some of the main ditches of the town were built by that times.

The Moors, surely the creators of the town which is now Novallas, remained here until 1610 (date of the expulsion of the Moors of Aragon). A big part of superb network of irrigation ditches supplying the orchards of the village and the urban structure in its oldest part where created during the Muslim domination period. Probably, the church was first a mosque and the castle has its origin in a Muslim stronghold.

The conquest of Tarazona by Alfonso I, The Battler, was in 1119, so it is assumed that in that year was also taken Novallas, by someone named Fortún Aznárez. Around this year should be the origin of the name of Novallas, Latin novalia = new places, fallow, ready to be cultivated, which would evolve to Novallas according to Aragones phonetic (in Castilian it had evolved to something like Novaja).

Years after the conquest Lazarus, son of Fortún Aznárez, donated the castle to the Templars. There are traces of stay of the Templars in the church, where there is a Templar cross carved on the outside of the apse. There is also a place between Novallas and Monteagudo with the name of Templars, which is supposed to correspond with the location of a hermitage used by them.

The Moors continued to live in Novallas as Mudejar (Muslim people in Christian territory). They were the majority and had its own legal entity, as manifested through its "aljama" agreements, as well as participate in the council meetings.

Cristian families lived in the neighborhood of San Miguel. Apparently, the fragmentation of this neighborhood could have been stocked according to the Fuero Jaqués (equal houses for equal men). In this neighborhood there was a hermitage. Next to this hermitage there was a convent of monks.

Being situated next to the border between Navarre and Aragon, it is possible that for some period may belong to Navarre after the death of Alfonso I and the separation of kingdoms. In fact it is known that the near villages of Malon and Vierlas belonged to Navarre.

During the period 1356-1369, the so-called "two peters war" happened, between Peter I of Castile, the Cruel, and Peter IV of Aragon, the Ceremonious. During this conflict Novallas was taken by the Castilians, being recovered by the troops of the Bishop of Tarazona Pedro Perez.

As in the rest of Aragon, in 1610 the Moors were expelled. Expulsion hit 59 houses and 295 people, who were the majority population. Novallas did not recovered from this depopulation until the 18th century.

Heraldry:

Flag of Novallas

Old Coat of Arms of Novallas

=== Illustrious locals ===
Jesús Luis Cunchillos Ilarri

Jesús Luis Cunchillos was born in 1936 in Novallas, Aragon, Spain. He obtained various doctoral degrees from Spain and Paris, and was a prolific writer, the author of 160 books and scientific articles. Cunchillos was Profesor de Investigacion of the Consejo Superior de Investigaciones Científicas (CSIC), Spain, which is attached to the Instituto de Filología, Département of Filología Biblica y Oriente Proximo. He was also the Manager of the Hermeneutics Lab.

== Culture ==
Traditions:

Some of the outstanding traditions are:

"La Vieja" (The old woman), which takes place on Thursday of the week which is at half of Lent. Children ask the grandmothers snack (traditionally omelet with "chorizo" - Spanish red sausage) to go to eat at the place known as "Fuente Vieja" (old fountain), located on the banks of the river Queiles.

The pilgrimage to Santipol is the second of three rotations that preceded the Ascension related to the blessing of fields. The pilgrimage begins with a procession to a hill in which there is a votive column from which the priest bless the fields. It is tradition for the council to give a bag of salty almonds and a piece bread to the participants.

At San Blas day morning, the tradition is to bless the "roscones" (ring-shaped cakes).

Novallas also celebrated San Antón and San Isidro.

Eating:

The "rancho" is the typical meal to eat in crew. It consists of a stew of pork, hare or rabbit with potatoes.

During the patron festivals, a mass lunch is celebrated. The food is based on white beans and brave bull.

The vegetables are very good, especially borage, chicory, artichokes and cardoon.

== See also ==
- List of municipalities in Zaragoza
