= Malón, Zaragoza =

Coordinates: 41°57′N 1°40′W

Malón, Spain
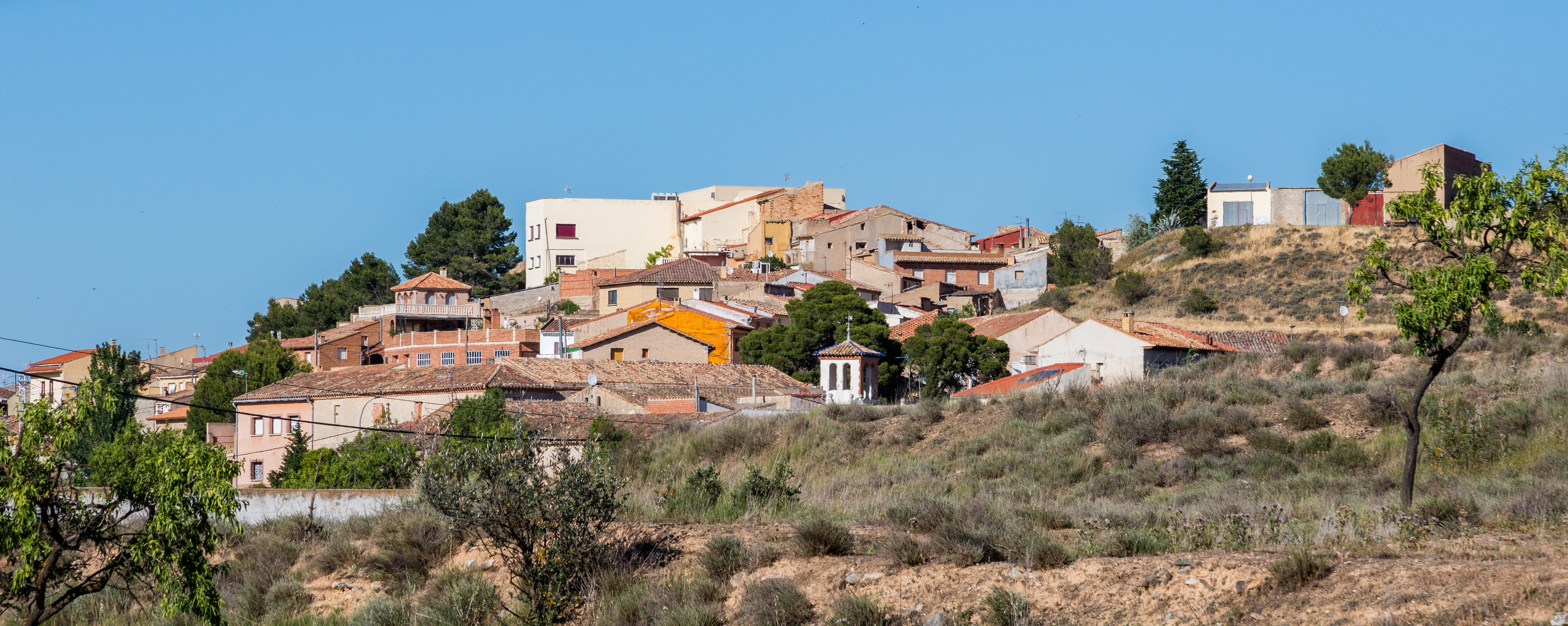

- Flag Coat of arms
- Interactive map of Malón, Spain
- Country: Spain
- Autonomous community: Aragon
- Province: Zaragoza
- Comarca: Tarazona y el Moncayo

Area
  - Total: 5 km^{2} (1.9 sq mi)

Population (2025-01-01)
  - Total: 474
  - Density: 95/km^{2} (250/sq mi)
- Time zone: UTC+1 (CET)
  - Summer (DST): UTC+2 (CEST)

Malón is a municipality located in the province of Zaragoza, Aragon, Spain. According to the 2004 census (INE), the municipality has a population of 427 inhabitants.

== See also ==
- List of municipalities in Zaragoza
