= Vierlas =

Coordinates: 41°56′N 1°41′W

- municipality
- Flag Coat of arms
- Interactive map of Vierlas
- Country: Spain
- Autonomous community: Aragon
- Province: Zaragoza
- Comarca: Tarazona y el Moncayo

Area
  - Total: 2 km^{2} (0.77 sq mi)

Population (2025-01-01)
  - Total: 88
  - Density: 44/km^{2} (110/sq mi)
- Time zone: UTC+1 (CET)
  - Summer (DST): UTC+2 (CEST)

Vierlas is a municipality located in Zaragoza Province, Aragon, Spain. According to the 2004 census (INE), the municipality has a population of 98 inhabitants.

== Location ==
Vierlas is located in the province of Zaragoza on the road between Tarazona and Tudela, known as El Tarazonica.

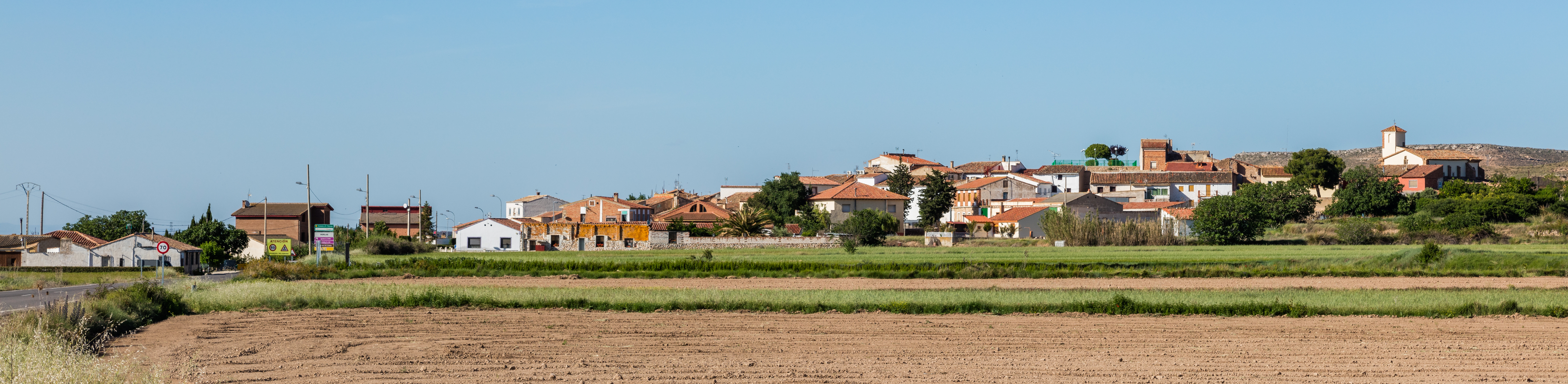
View of Vierlas, Zaragoza, Spain

== See also ==
- List of municipalities in Zaragoza
