= Santa Cruz de Moncayo =

Coordinates: 41°53′N 1°45′W

- municipality
- Flag Coat of arms
- Interactive map of Santa Cruz de Moncayo
- Country: Spain
- Autonomous community: Aragon
- Province: Zaragoza
- Comarca: Tarazona y el Moncayo

Area
  - Total: 4 km^{2} (1.5 sq mi)

Population (2025-01-01)
  - Total: 123
  - Density: 31/km^{2} (80/sq mi)
- Time zone: UTC+1 (CET)
  - Summer (DST): UTC+2 (CEST)

Santa Cruz de Moncayo is a municipality located in the province of Zaragoza, Aragon, Spain. According to the 2004 census (INE), the municipality has a population of 118 inhabitants.

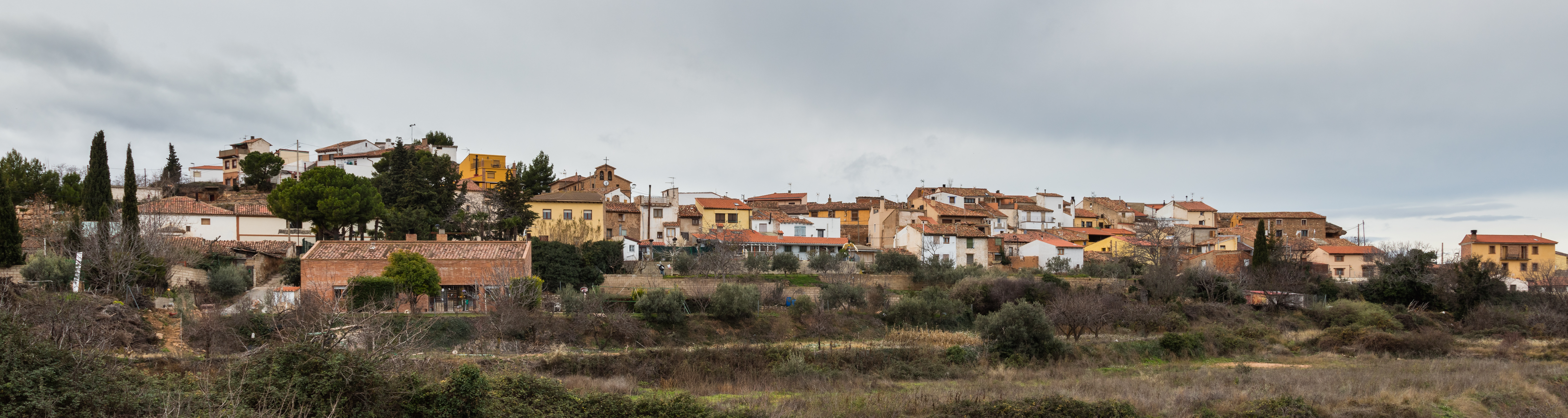
View of Santa Cruz de Moncayo, Zaragoza, Spain

== See also ==
- List of municipalities in Zaragoza
