= Montchauvet, Yvelines =

Montchauvet
- Commune
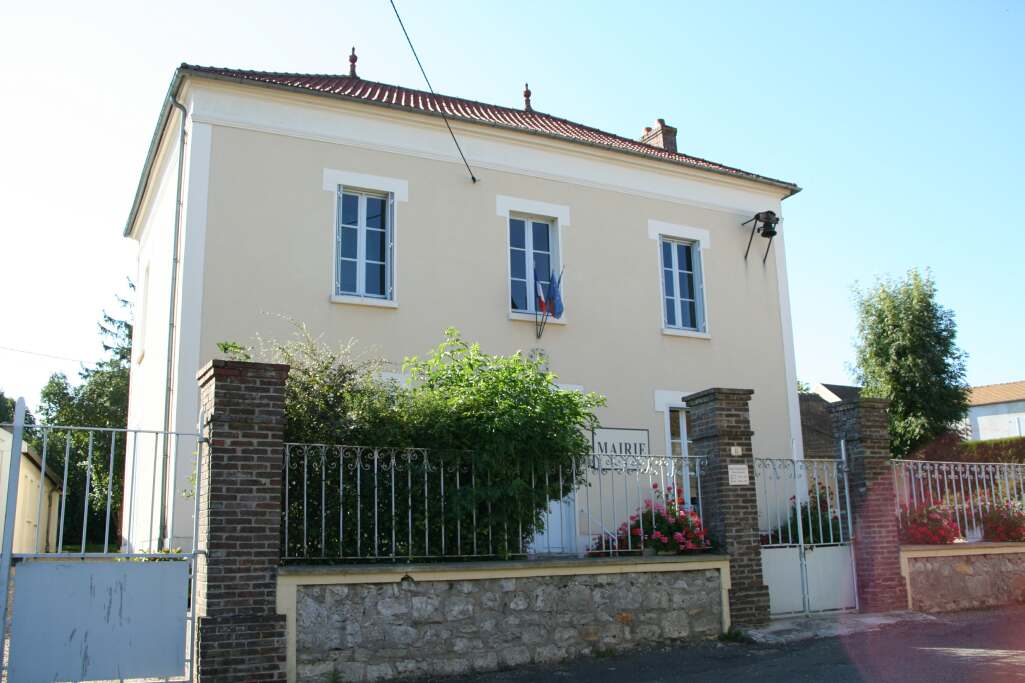
- Town hall

- Coat of arms
- Location of Montchauvet
- Location within France Location within Île-de-France (region)
- Coordinates: 48°53′32″N 1°37′50″E
- Country: France
- Region: Île-de-France
- Department: Yvelines
- Arrondissement: Mantes-la-Jolie
- Canton: Bonnières-sur-Seine
- Intercommunality: Pays houdanais

Government
  - Mayor (2020–2026): Georges Duval
- Area^{1}: 7.98 km^{2} (3.08 sq mi)
- Elevation: 81 m (266 ft)
- Highest elevation: 131 m (430 ft)
- Lowest elevation: 62 m (203 ft)
- Population (2023): 275
  - Density: 34.5/km^{2} (89.3/sq mi)
- Time zone: UTC+01:00 (CET)
  - Summer (DST): UTC+02:00 (CEST)
- INSEE/Postal code: 78417 /78790
- ^{1} French Land Register data, which excludes lakes, ponds, glaciers > 1 km^{2} (0.386 sq mi or 247 acres) and river estuaries.

Montchauvet (French pronunciation: [mɔ̃ʃovɛ]) is a commune in the Yvelines department in the Île-de-France region in north-central France.

== River ==
A small river named Ru d'Ouville traverses Montchauvet, passing through four other communes to a total length of 10.2 kilometres (6.3 mi). The Ru d'Ouville is a tributary of the Vaucouleurs which in turn empties into the Seine.

== History ==
A British bomber was shot down in the area of Montchauvet on 8 June 1944. The six men of its crew rest in the local graveyard.

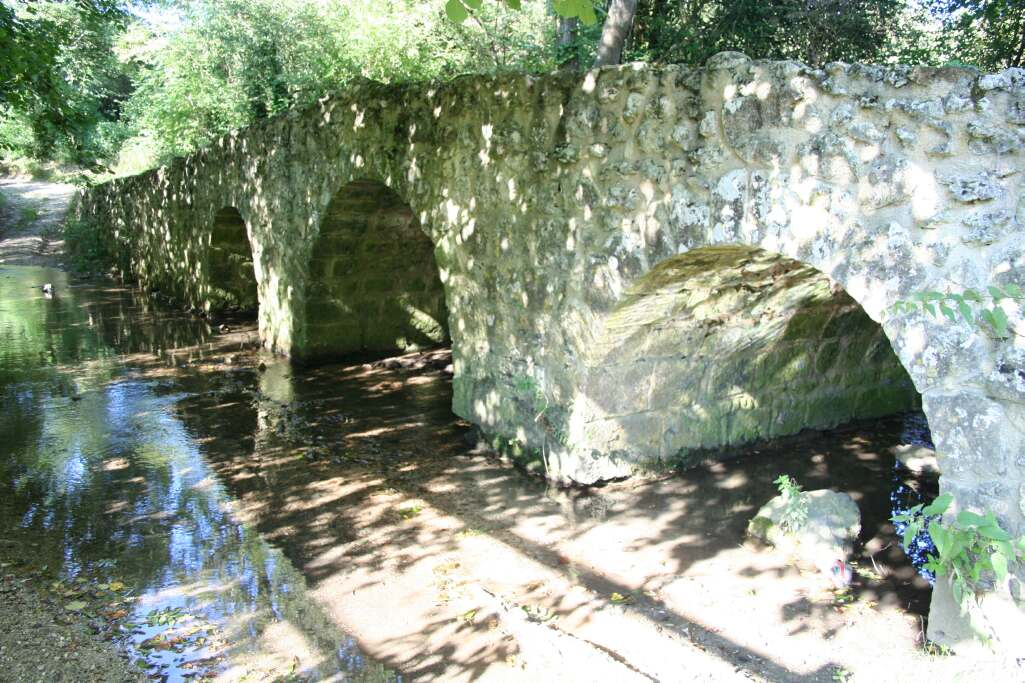
Bridge on the Ru d'Ouville

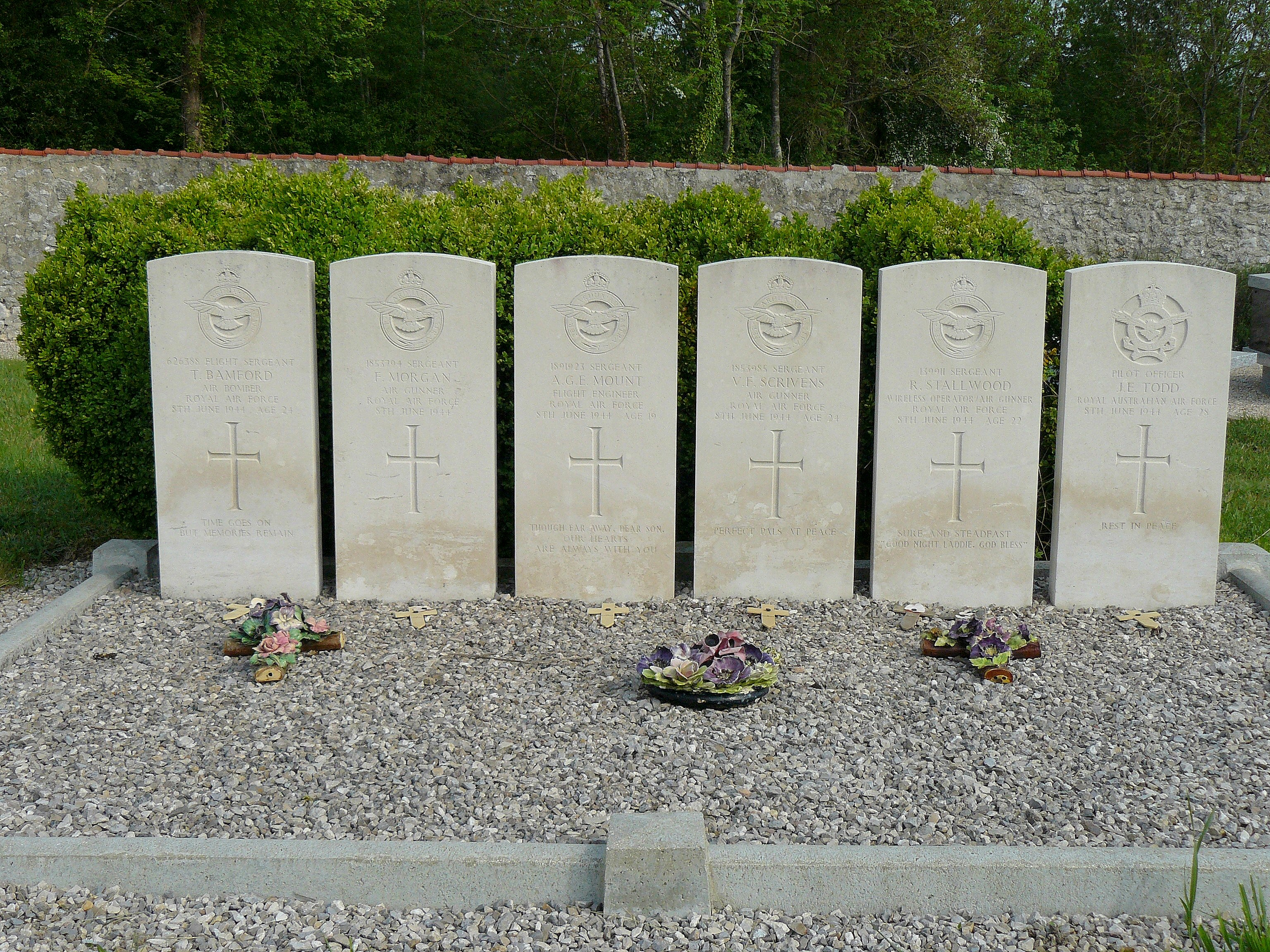
Allied pilots of World War II

== See also ==
- Communes of the Yvelines department
