= Beratón =

- Municipality
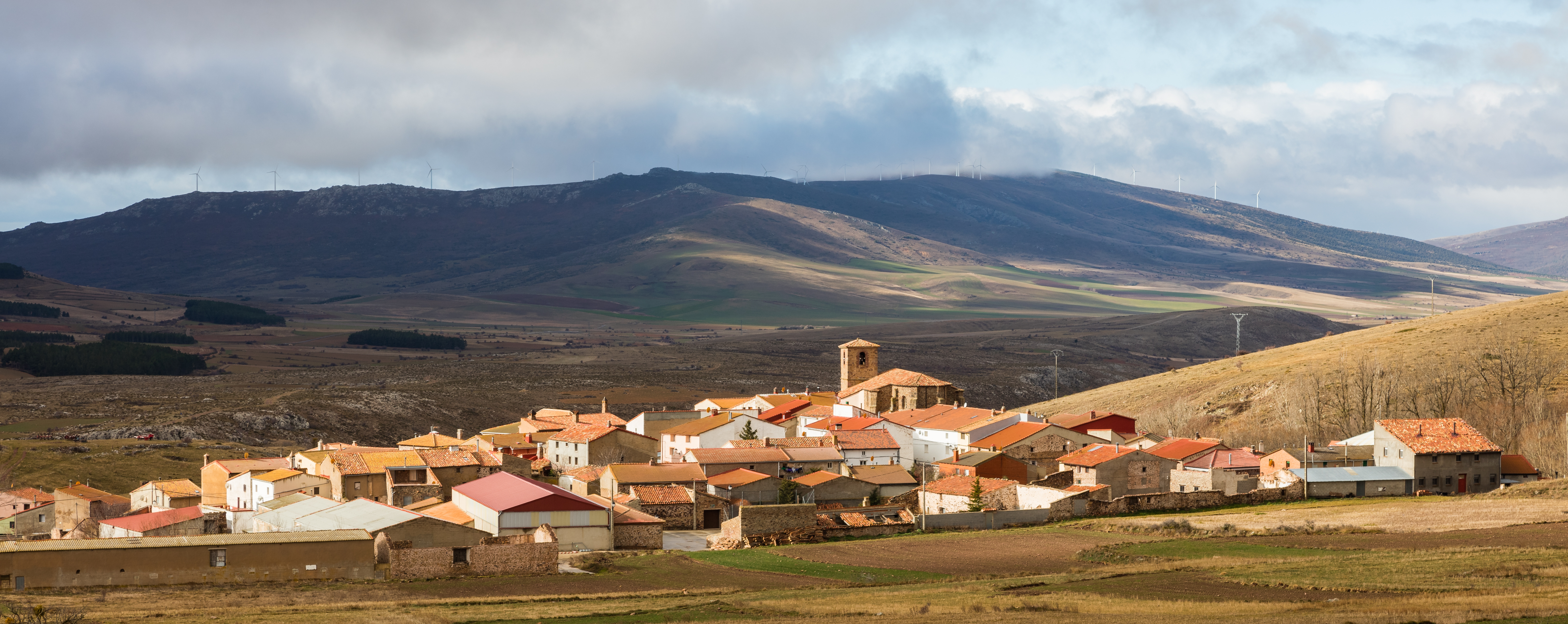

- Location in Spain Beratón (Spain)
- Country: Spain
- Autonomous community: Castile and León
- Province: Soria
- Comarca: Comarca del Moncayo

Area
  - Total: 41 km^{2} (16 sq mi)
- Elevation: 1,391 m (4,564 ft)

Population (2025-01-01)
  - Total: 38
  - Density: 0.93/km^{2} (2.4/sq mi)
- Time zone: UTC+1 (CET)
  - Summer (DST): UTC+2 (CEST)
- Website: Official website

Beratón is a municipality located in the province of Soria, Castile and León, Spain. According to the 2004 census (INE), the municipality has a population of 40 inhabitants.
