= Los Fayos =

- municipality
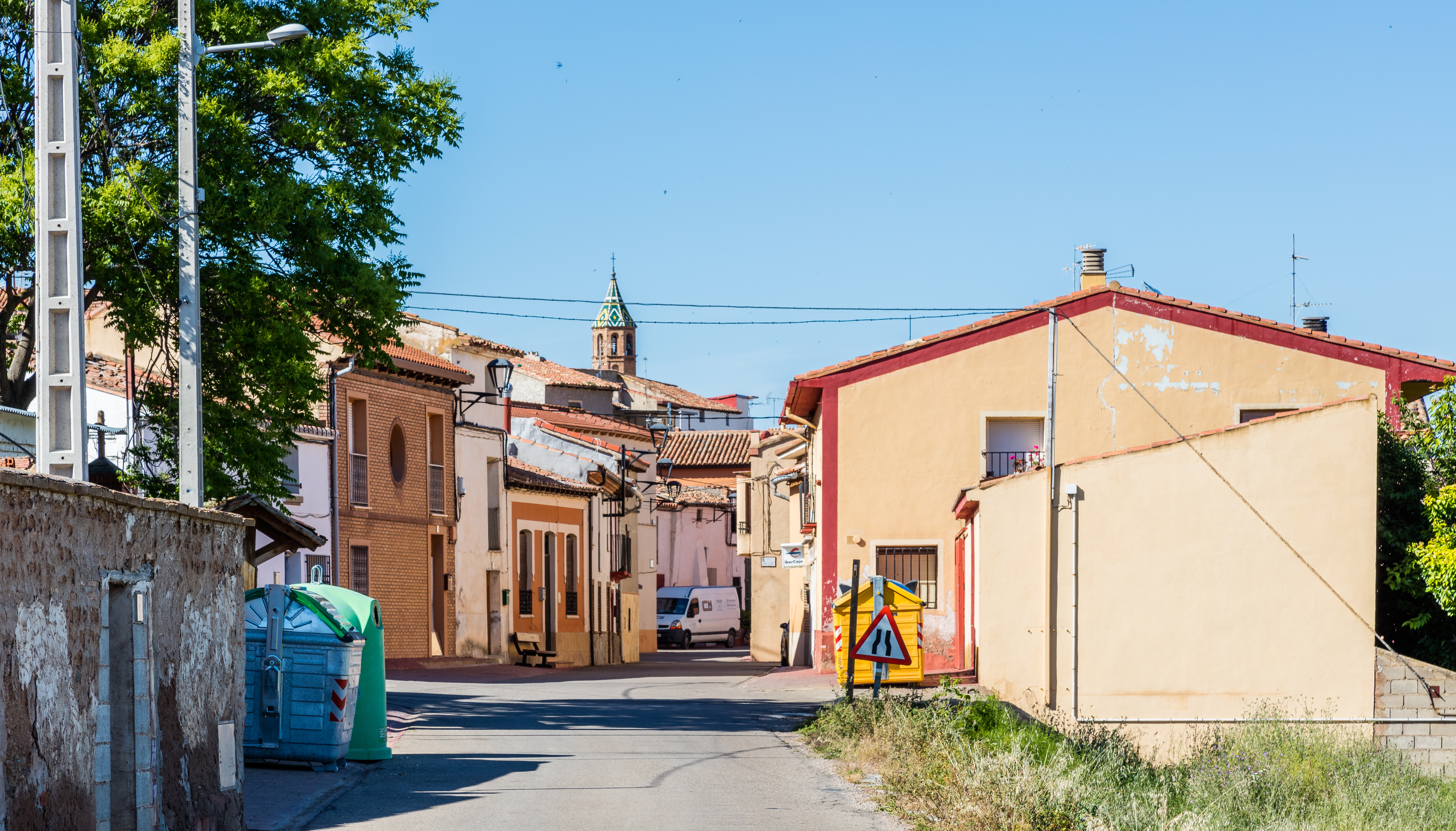

- Flag Coat of arms

- Location within Aragon Location within Spain Location within Europe
- Country: Spain
- Autonomous community: Aragon
- Province: Zaragoza
- Comarca: Tarazona y el Moncayo

Area
  - Total: 3.88 km^{2} (1.50 sq mi)

Population (2025-01-01)
  - Total: 135
  - Density: 34.8/km^{2} (90.1/sq mi)
- Time zone: UTC+1 (CET)
  - Summer (DST): UTC+2 (CEST)

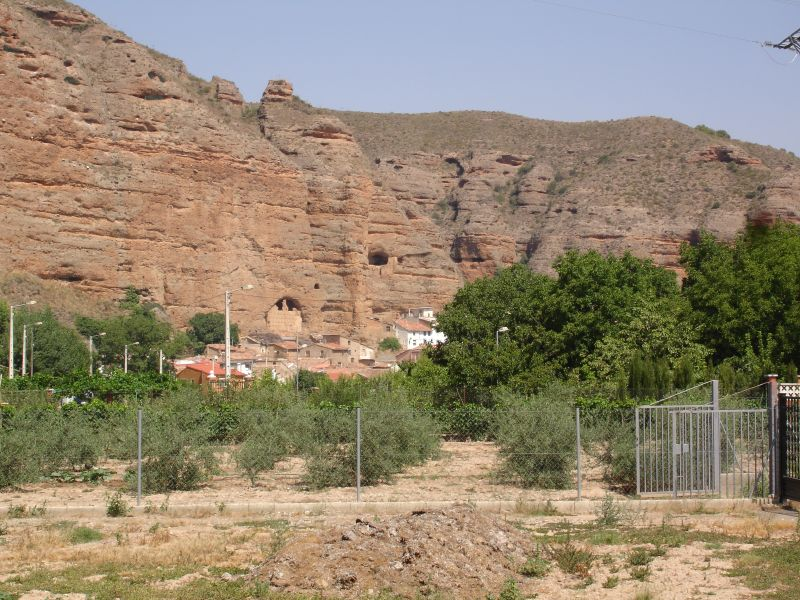
View of Los Fayos

Los Fayos is a municipality located in the province of Zaragoza, Aragon, Spain. According to the 2010 census the municipality has a population of 153 inhabitants. Its postal code is 50513.

The town is built below a red cliff.

In 1221, the town was purchased by King Sancho VII of Navarre.

== See also ==
- List of municipalities in Zaragoza
