= Grisel =

- municipality
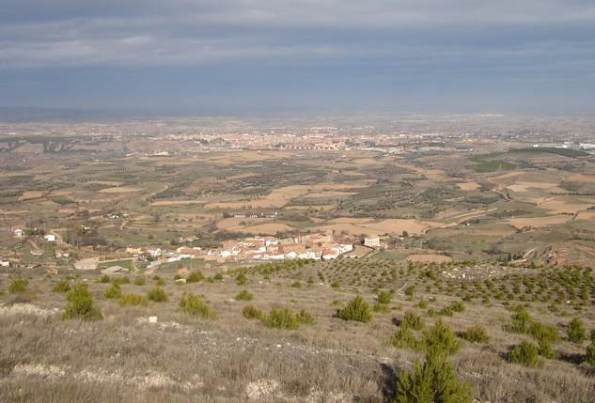

- Flag Coat of arms
- Nickname: Gris
- Location within Aragon Location within Spain Location within Europe
- Country: Spain
- Autonomous community: Aragon
- Province: Zaragoza
- Comarca: Tarazona y el Moncayo

Area
  - Total: 14 km^{2} (5.4 sq mi)

Population (2025-01-01)
  - Total: 101
  - Density: 7.2/km^{2} (19/sq mi)
- Time zone: UTC+1 (CET)
  - Summer (DST): UTC+2 (CEST)

Grisel is a municipality located in the province of Zaragoza, Aragon, Spain. According to the 2004 census (INE) the municipality had a population of 60 inhabitants.

== See also ==
- List of municipalities in Zaragoza
