= Moncayo Range =

Mountain range in Spain

Moncayo
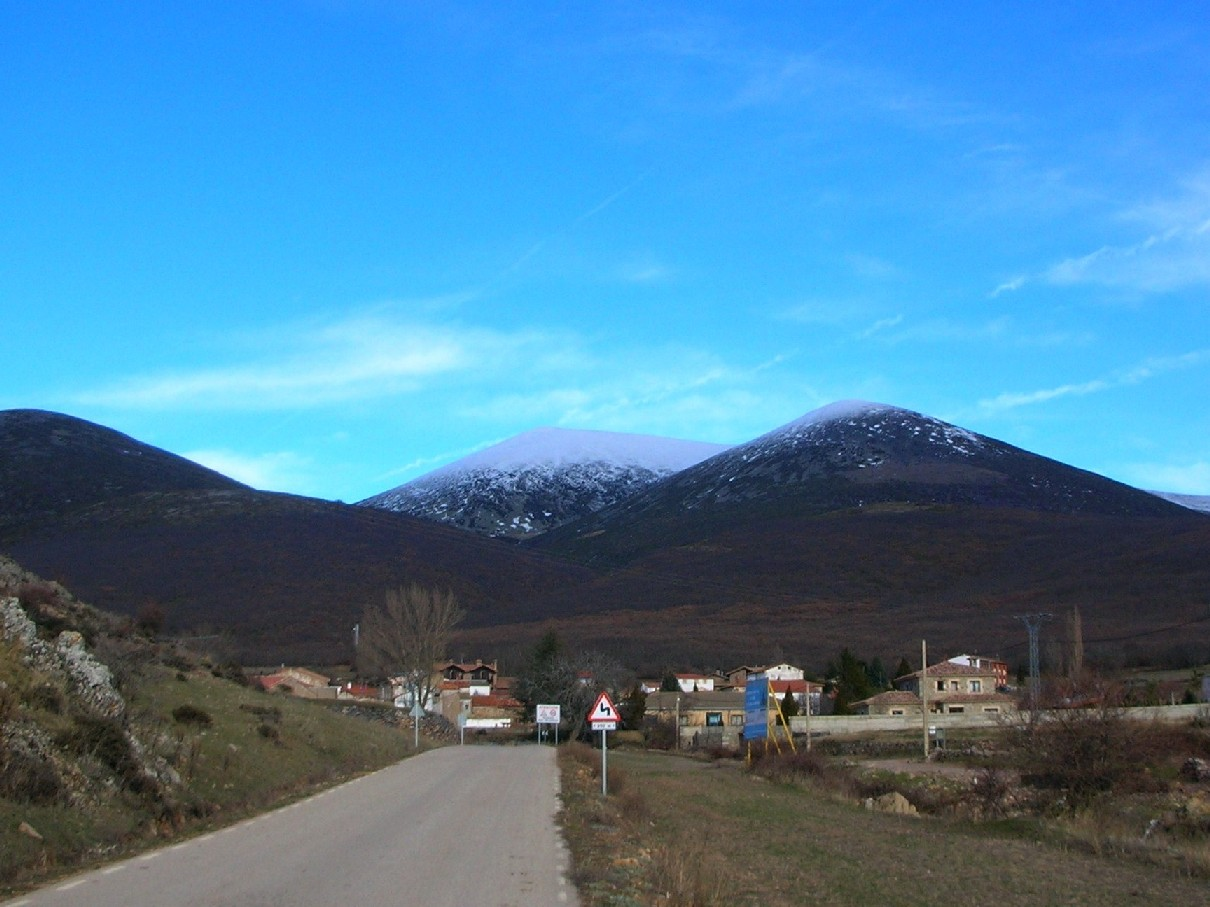
- View of Cueva de Ágreda town with the massive three summits of the Moncayo in the background

Highest point
- Elevation: 2,314 m (7,592 ft)
- Prominence: 1,297 m (4,255 ft)
- Listing: Mountains of Aragon, Ribu
- Coordinates: 41°47′17″N 1°50′18″W

Geography
- Location within Spain
- Location: Tarazona y el Moncayo, Campo de borja, Aranda (Aragon); Province of Soria (Castile and León)
- Parent range: Sistema Ibérico

Geology
- Mountain type: Slate

Climbing
- First ascent: Unknown
- Easiest route: From the Santuario de la Virgen del Moncayo, from Cueva de Ágreda, or from Beratón

Moncayo is a 15 km long and about 7 km wide mountain chain giving name to the Tarazona y el Moncayo comarca, Aragon, Spain. The Moncayo's highest summit, San Miguel (2,314 metres (7,592 ft)), is the highest point in the 500 km long Sistema Ibérico.

The Moncayo is located between the provinces of Zaragoza in Aragon and Soria in Castile and León. The ridge's highest summits are usually covered in snow between October and May every year.

== Description ==
Besides the San Miguel, the Moncayo massif includes two other peaks that are almost identical and are located close together, Cerro San Juan (2,283 m) and Peña Lobera (2,226 m).

This mountain was mentioned as Mons Caius by Marcus Valerius Martialis in Ancient Roman times.

The nearest large town to Moncayo is Tarazona, with many old and historical buildings, located on the massif's northern side 10 km away from it. There are also smaller villages closer to the mountain.

The Sierra de Nava Alta and Sierra del Bollón are eastern prolongations of the Moncayo Massif.

== Hiking ==
Moncayo is one of the most popular hiking places in Spain and there is public transport to reach the mountain. There are few buses during the winter season, but almost hourly connections in the summertime.

From the village of San Martín de la Virgen de Moncayo starts a road for hikers, ending at the village of Agramonte. The lower ranges of the mountain are covered by forest, including oak trees and spiky shrubs. There is a wide path at the northern side of the mountain zigzagging upwards. In the northeast corner of the mountain is a mountain hut made of stone which can be used as shelter in emergency situations. The shelter is located at the car park north of the Lobera peak before the slope. At the northwest side of the mountain is a tiny river. One can ascend the highest peak going up from Agramonte or from the eastern side of the mountain range, also via Lobera peak. Going up takes about three hours. There are a few loose stone sections which can be avoided when following the paths. On the top of the highest peak one can see the Pyrenees in clear weather.

== Features ==
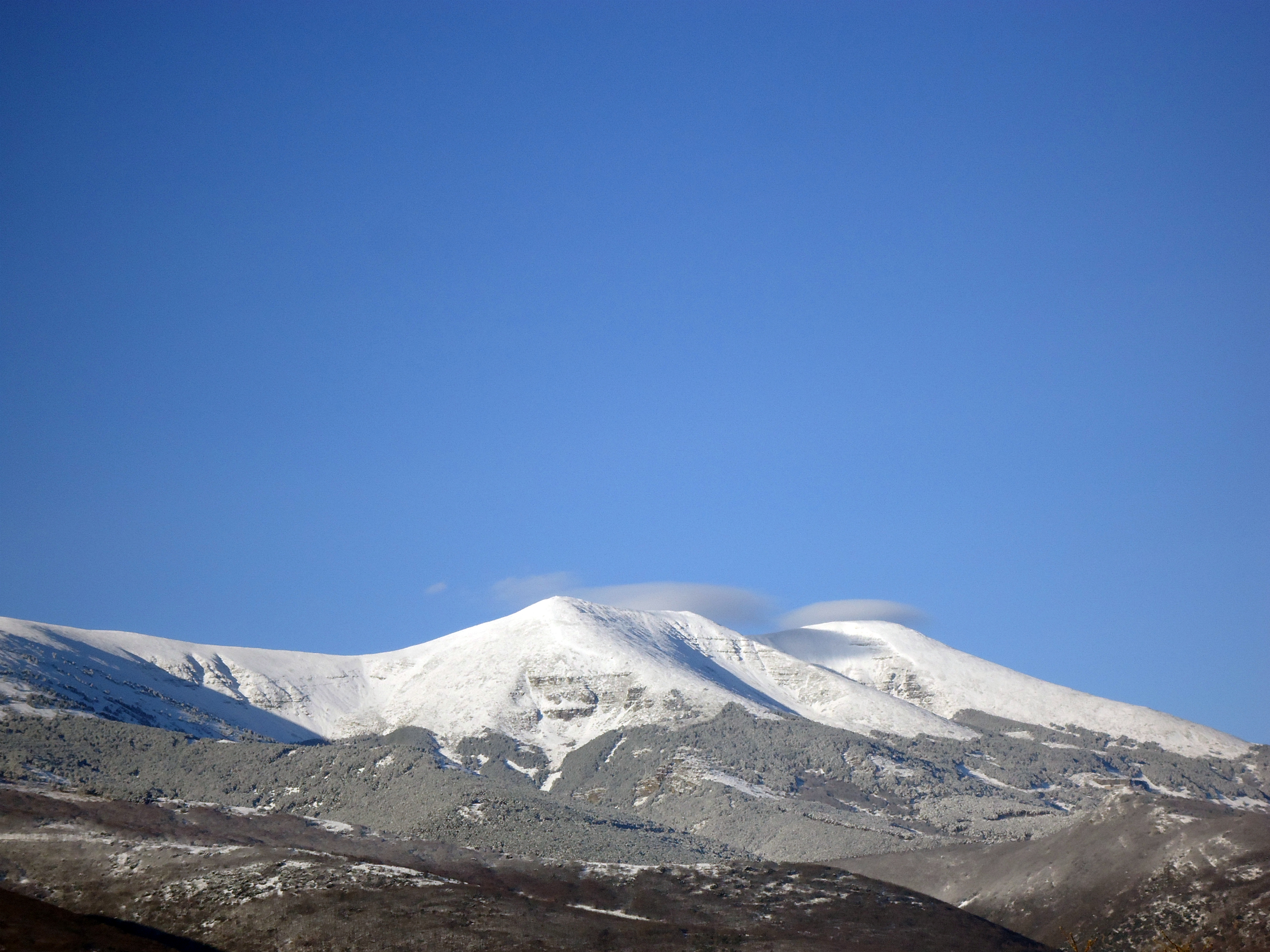
View of the Pico de San Miguel

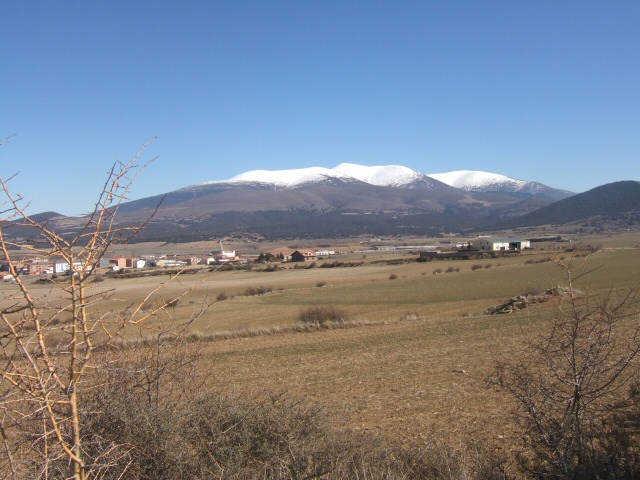
Moncayo seen from Ólvega

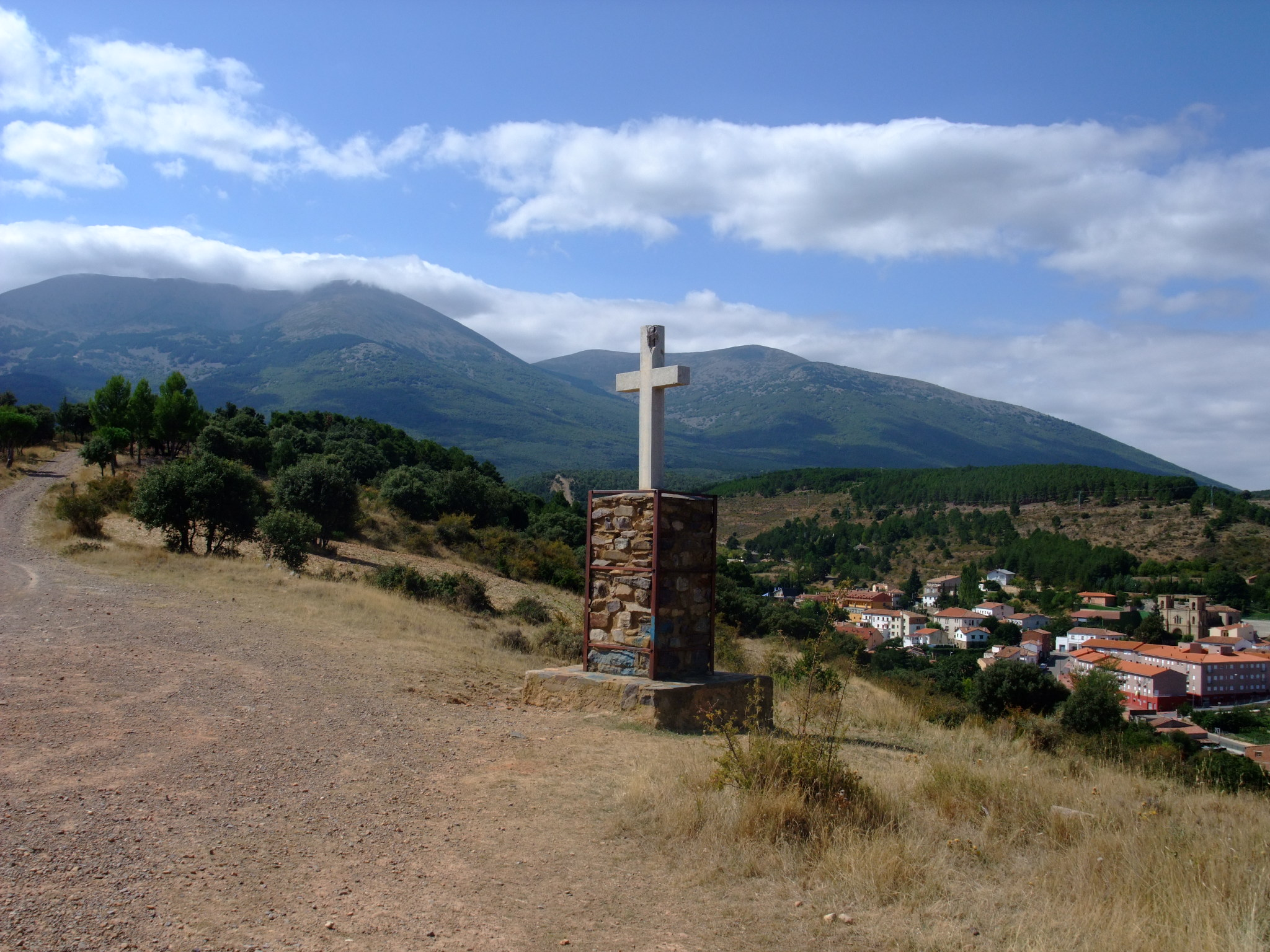
Cross at San Martín de la Virgen de Moncayo

== See also ==
- Tarazona
- Sistema Ibérico
- List of mountains in Aragon
