= Queiles =

River in Spain

Coordinates: 42.0639°N 1.5997°W

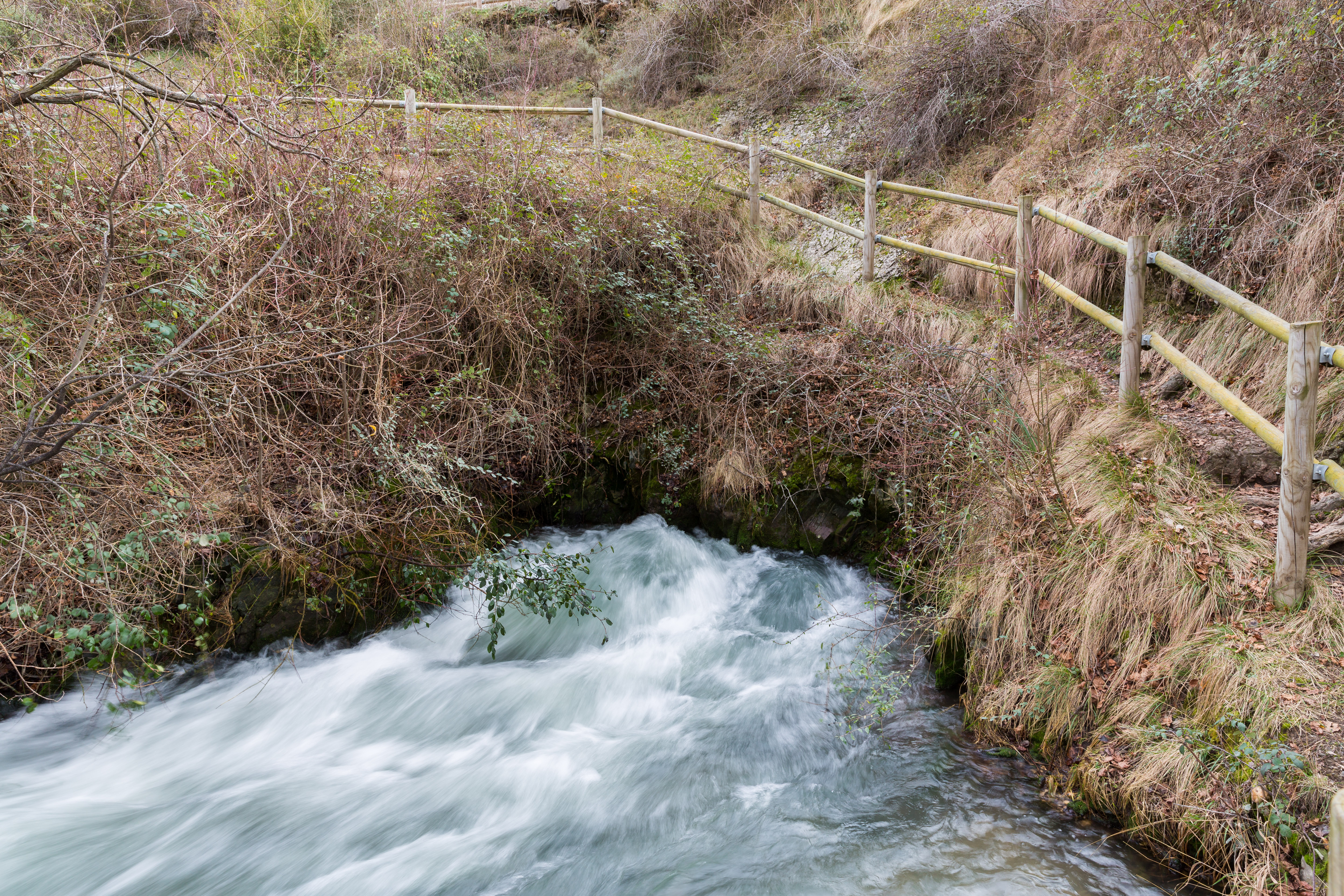
Source of Queiles

The Queiles is a tributary of the Ebro. Its arises in Vozmediano (Soria). It flows through Tarazona (Zaragoza), and empties into the Ebro near Tudela (Navarre).

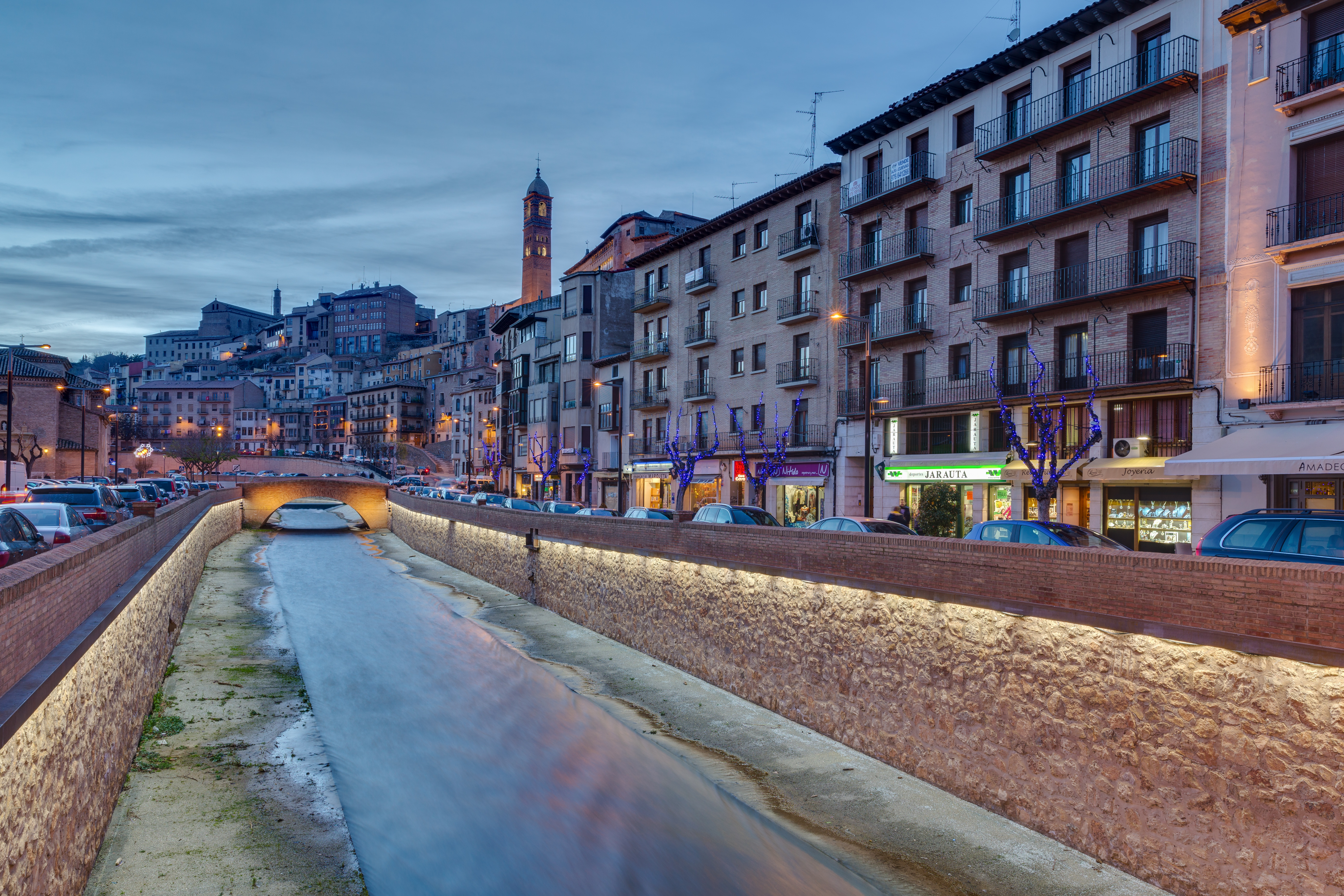
Queiles through Tarazona.

== See also ==
- List of rivers of Spain
