= Comunidad de Calatayud =

- Comarca
- Flag Coat of arms

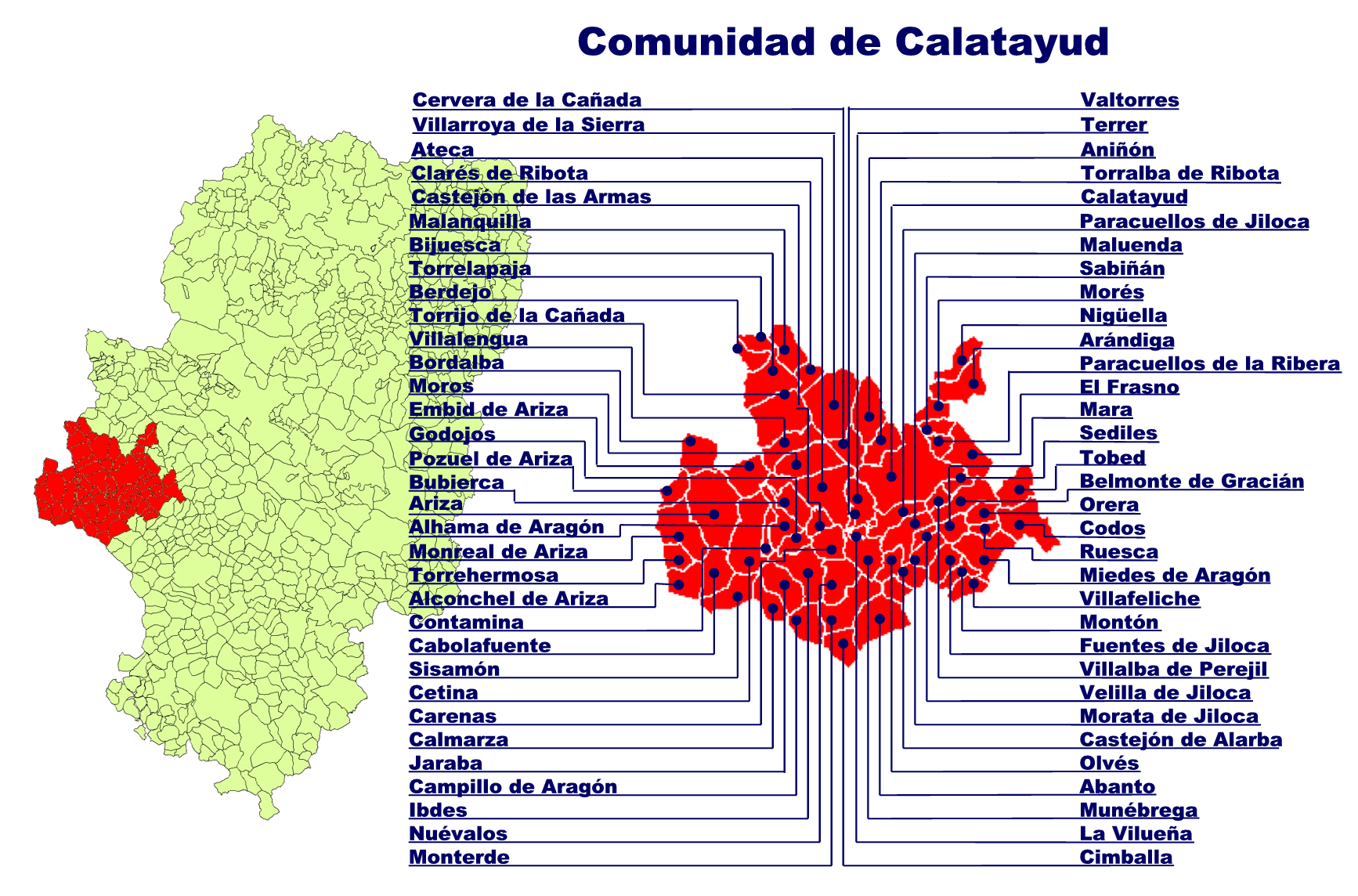
- Coordinates: 41°21′N 1°38′W
- Country: Spain
- Autonomous community: Aragón
- Province: Zaragoza
- Capital: Calatayud
- Municipalities: List: Abanto, Alarba, Alconchel de Ariza, Alhama de Aragón, Aniñón, Arándiga, Ariza, Ateca, Belmonte de Gracián, Berdejo, Bijuesca, Bordalba, Bubierca, Cabolafuente, Calmarza, Calatayud, Campillo de Aragón, Carenas, Castejón de Alarba, Castejón de las Armas, Cervera de la Cañada, Cetina, Cimballa, Clarés de Ribota, Codos, Contamina, El Frasno, Embid de Ariza, Fuentes de Jiloca, Godojos, Ibdes, Jaraba, La Vilueña, Malanquilla, Maluenda, Mara, Miedes, Monreal de Ariza, Monterde, Montón, Morata de Jiloca, Morés, Moros, Munébrega, Nigüella, Nuévalos, Olvés, Orera, Paracuellos de Jiloca, Paracuellos de la Ribera, Pozuelo de Ariza, Ruesca, Saviñán, Sediles, Sisamón, Terrer, Tobed, Torralba de Ribota, Torrehermosa, Torrelapaja, Torrijo, Valtorres, Velilla de Jiloca, Villafeliche, Villalba de Perejil, Villalengua, Villarroya

Area
  - Total: 2,518 km^{2} (972 sq mi)

Population (2008; INE)
  - Total: 42,379
  - Density: 16.83/km^{2} (43.59/sq mi)
- Demonym: Bilbilitano
- Time zone: UTC+1 (CET)
  - Summer (DST): UTC+2 (CEST)
- Largest municipality: Calatayud
- Website: http://www.comunidadcalatayud.com/

The Comunidad de Calatayud is one of the comarcas of Aragon, Spain. It is one of twelve comarcas (administrative subdivisions) within the province of Zaragoza in Aragón. The administrative headquarters are in the city of Calatayud. Local wine (Calatayud (DO)) achieved Denominación de Origen status in 1990 and it is the second largest wine-producing area in Aragón after Cariñena (DO). Fruit and wheat are major agricultural products, there is also light industry and tourism. The area is noted for balnearios (thermal spas) at Alhama de Aragón, Jaraba, and Paracuellos, also for its mudéjar architecture.

67 municipalities make up the comarca, which is located in a mountainous area of the Iberian System.

The Comunidad de Calatayud is bounded to the north by Aranda and Valdejalón, on the east by Campo de Cariñena and Campo de Daroca, to the south by La Serrania and Señorío de Molina-Alto Tajo, Guadalajara (province), and to the west by the Tierra de Medinaceli (province of Soria). The major rivers are the Jalón, Piedra, and Jiloca.

The population of the comarca was 42,379 in 2008, the area is 2,518 km^{2}.

== History ==
The area was established as a community of villages founded by Alfonso I after the Reconquista. This community had full autonomy to organize itself economically and militarily, as it was a frontier territory. Historically, the region was larger as it included municipalities that are currently part of Soria and Guadalajara provinces. In the 19th century, it was a province, including the comarcas of Aranda, and parts of Daroca, Valdejalón, and Jiloca. In 2001, the present comarca was created under legislation promulgated by the Government of Aragón.

== Archaeology ==
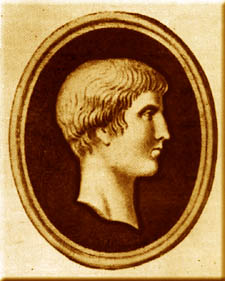
Martial.

Celtic remains have been found in Munébrega, Monreal de Ariza, Mara, and Calatayud. The remains of the Roman city of Augusta Bilbilis, birthplace of the poet Marco Valerio Marcial (Martial), have been excavated near Calatayud.

Remains of castles are still visible at Calatayud, Nuévalos, Alhama de Aragon, Maluenda, Torrijos, Calmarza, and Cimballa.

== Main sights ==
The Monasterio de Piedra was founded as a monastery in the 12th century and is now a hotel and water gardens near Nuévalos. At Alhama de Aragón, there is the largest thermal lake in Spain.

== Famous people ==
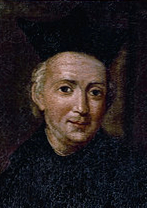
Baltasar Gracián.

- Juan Fernández de Heredia, a writer, politician and diplomat in the service of Peter IV of Aragon and Grand Master of the Order of St. John of Jerusalem.
- Pascual Marquina Narro, 20th-century composer.
- Marco Valerio Marcial, Roman poet.
- Baltasar Gracián, 17th-century author.
- Antonio Serón, 16th-century poet.
- Joaquín Dicenta, 19th-century poet, journalist and playwright.
- Sixto Celorrio, 20th-century writer, journalist, poet, folklorist and politician.
- Ángel Vicioso, professional cyclist.
- Paul Abián, professional badminton player.
