= Calmarza =

- municipality
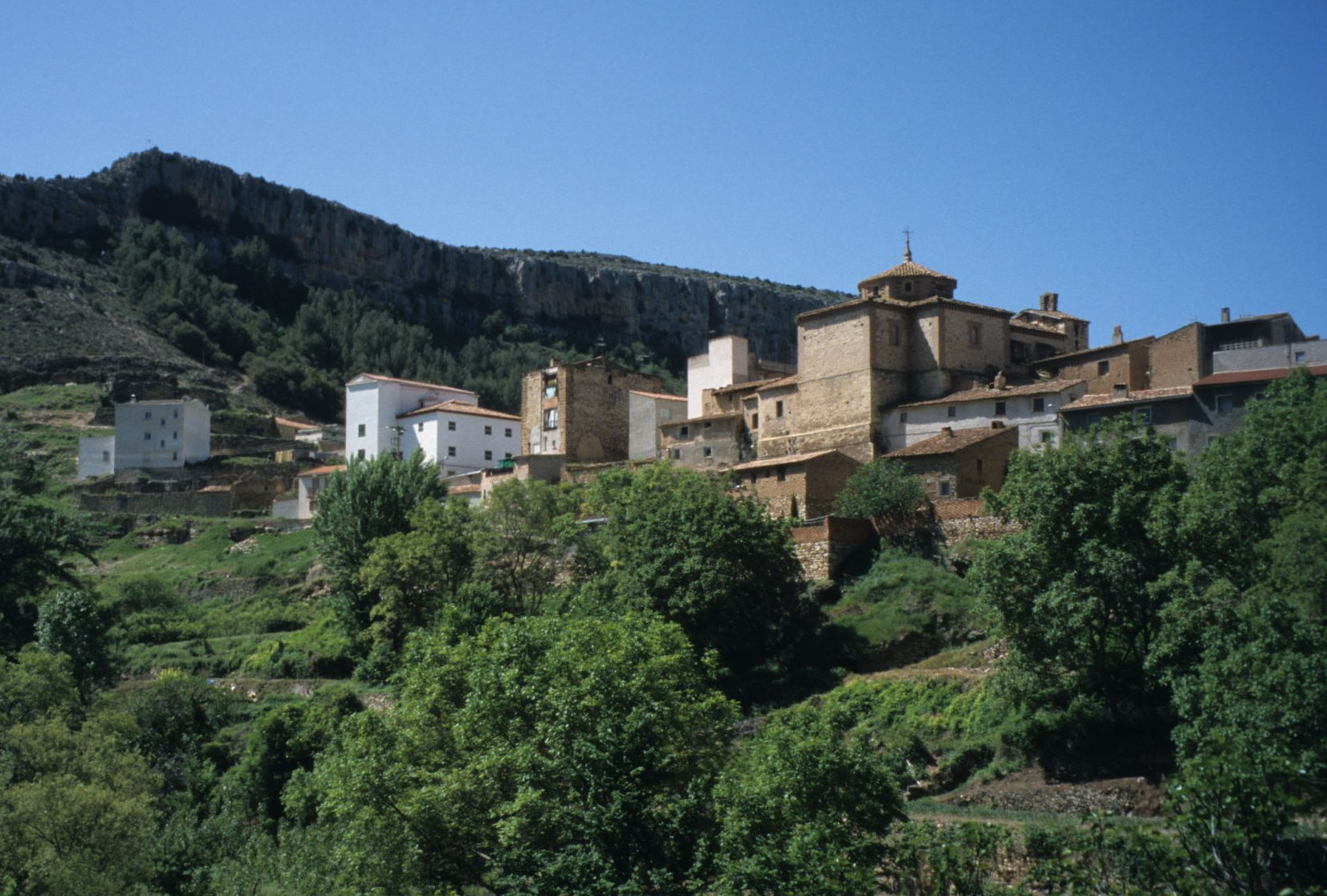
- View of Calmarza with the Sierra de Solorio cliffs above the town

- Flag Coat of arms

- Location within Aragon Location within Spain Location within Europe
- Country: Spain
- Autonomous community: Aragon
- Province: Zaragoza
- Comarca: Comunidad de Calatayud

Area
  - Total: 28 km^{2} (11 sq mi)

Population (2025-01-01)
  - Total: 57
  - Density: 2.0/km^{2} (5.3/sq mi)
- Time zone: UTC+1 (CET)
  - Summer (DST): UTC+2 (CEST)

Calmarza is a municipality located in the province of Zaragoza, Aragon, Spain. According to the 2010 census the municipality has a population of 77 inhabitants.

This town is located close to the limits of Guadalajara Province in the Mesa River valley, at the feet of the Sierra de Solorio range, Sistema Ibérico. The nearest town is Jaraba.

== See also ==
- Comunidad de Calatayud
- List of municipalities in Zaragoza
