= Selas =

- Coat of arms

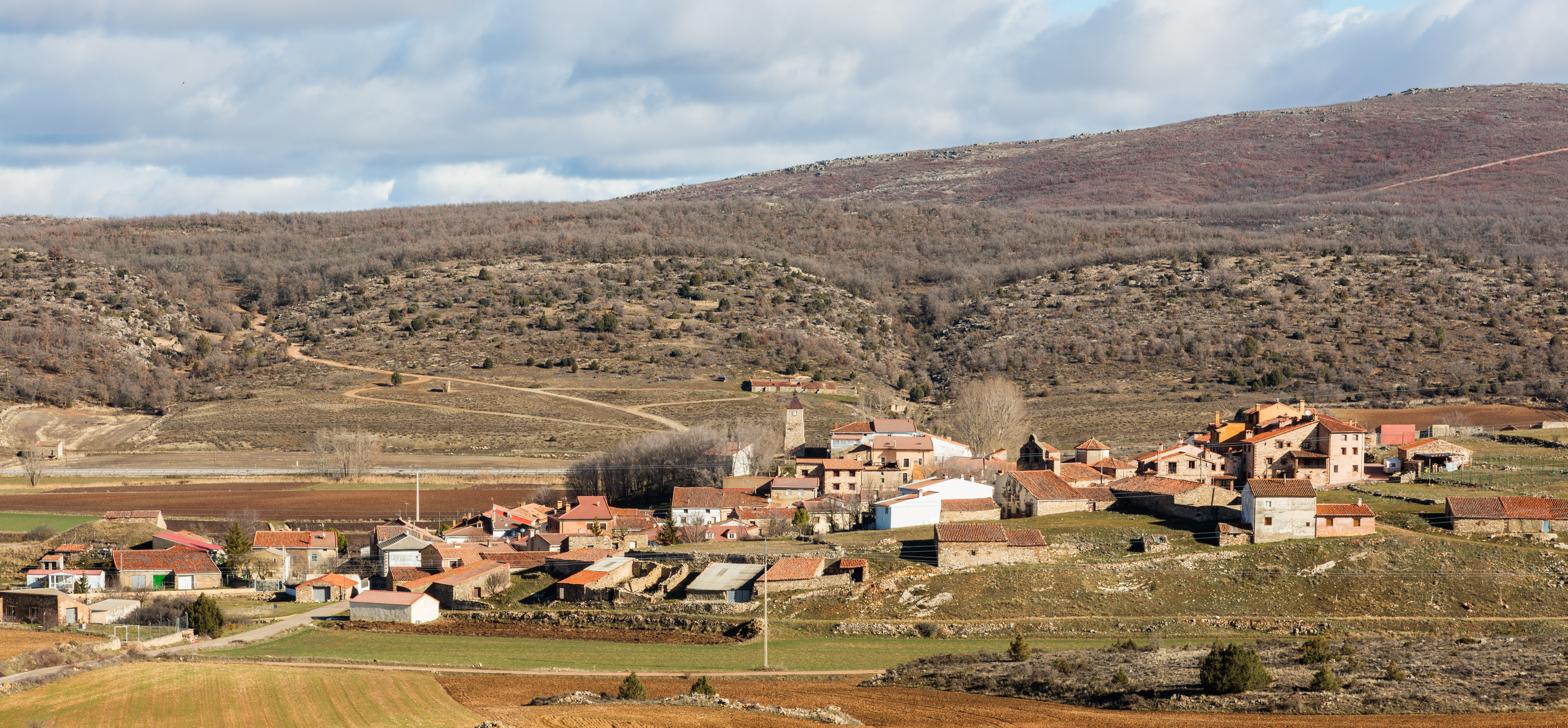

- Location within Province of Guadalajara Location within Castilla-La Mancha Location within Spain
- Coordinates: 40°57′9″N 2°6′2″W
- Country: Spain
- Autonomous community: Castile-La Mancha
- Province: Guadalajara
- Comarca: Señorío de Molina-Alto Tajo

Area
  - Total: 44 km^{2} (17 sq mi)

Population (2025-01-01)
  - Total: 33
  - Density: 0.75/km^{2} (1.9/sq mi)
- Time zone: UTC+1 (CET)
  - Summer (DST): UTC+2 (CEST)

Selas is a municipality located in the province of Guadalajara, Castile-La Mancha, Spain. According to the 2004 census (INE), the municipality had a population of 63 inhabitants.

The Mesa River rises in the Sierra de Solorio range area near Selas.

== See also ==
- List of municipalities in Guadalajara
