= Mara, Aragon =

Coordinates: 41°17′24″N 1°31′08″W

Mara
- municipality
- Flag Coat of arms
- Interactive map of Mara
- Country: Spain
- Autonomous community: Aragon
- Province: Zaragoza
- Comarca: Comunidad de Calatayud

Area
  - Total: 21.08 km^{2} (8.14 sq mi)
- Elevation: 688 m (2,257 ft)

Population (2025-01-01)
  - Total: 161
- Time zone: CET
  - Summer (DST): UTC+1
- Postal code: 50331

Mara is a municipality in province of Zaragoza, Aragon, Spain. According to the 2008 census (INE), the municipality has a population of 212 inhabitants.

It is located in the Comunidad de Calatayud comarca, on a high plateau that is part of the Sierra de Vicort range.

The archaeological remains of the Celtiberian and Romano-Celtiberian town of Segeda-Sekeiza are located between Mara and the nearby Belmonte de Gracián.

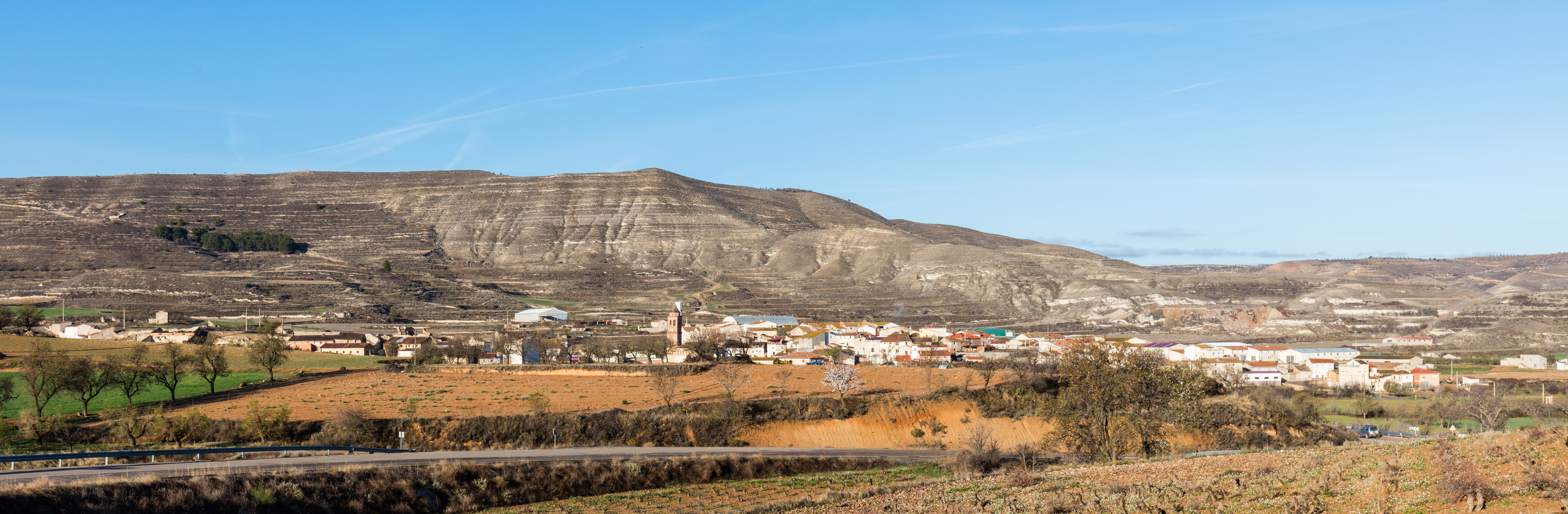
Panoramic view of Mara, Zaragoza, Spain

== See also ==
- List of municipalities in Zaragoza
