= Nigüella =

Nigüella, Spain
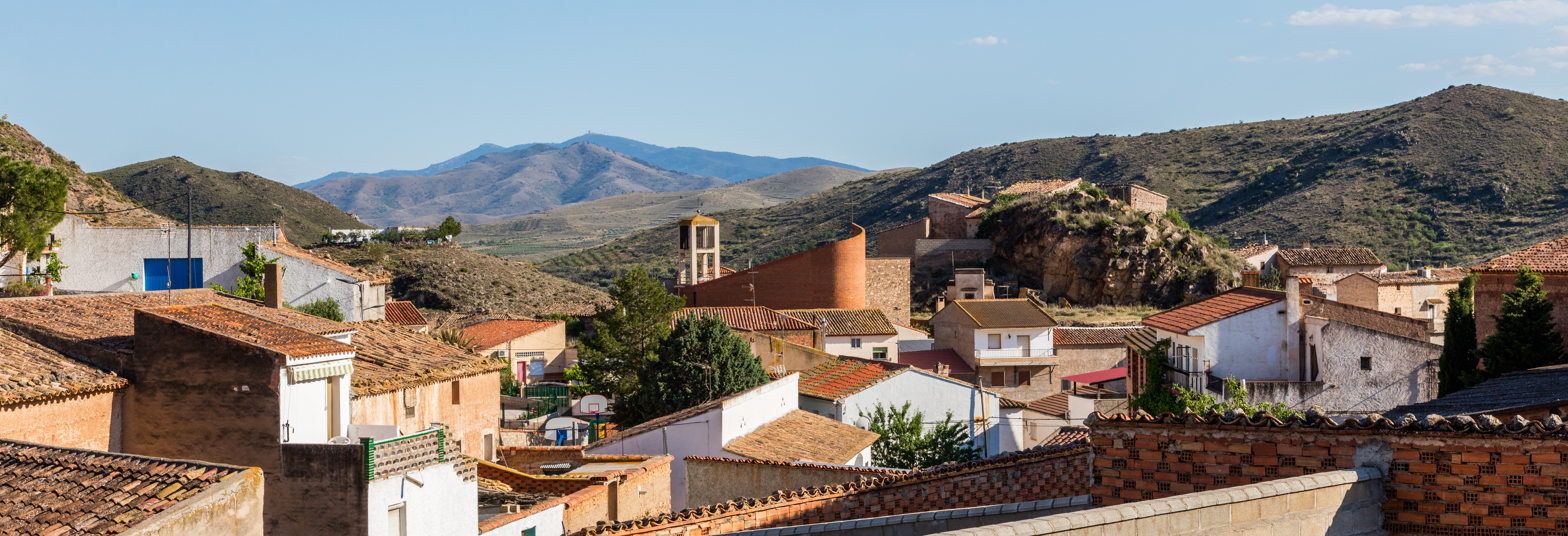

- Flag Coat of arms

- Location within Aragon Location within Spain Location within Europe
- Coordinates: 41°32′N 1°31′W
- Country: Spain
- Autonomous community: Aragon
- Province: Zaragoza
- Comarca: Comunidad de Calatayud

Area
  - Total: 30 km^{2} (12 sq mi)
- Elevation: 480 m (1,570 ft)

Population (2025-01-01)
  - Total: 58
  - Density: 1.9/km^{2} (5.0/sq mi)
- Time zone: UTC+1 (CET)
  - Summer (DST): UTC+2 (CEST)

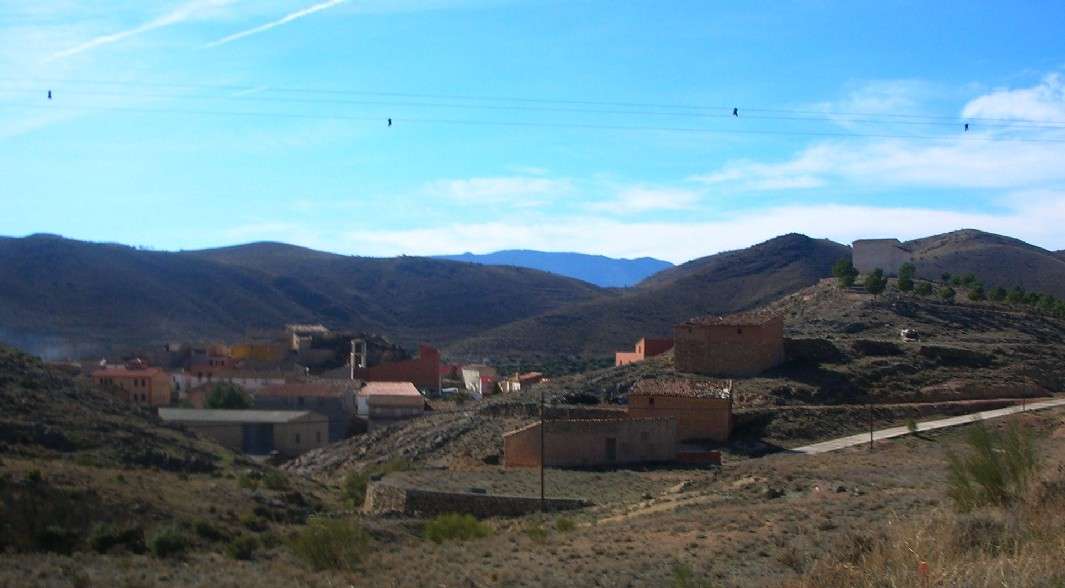
View of Nigüella town

Nigüella (French pronunciation: [niˈɣweʎa]) is a municipality located in the province of Zaragoza, Aragon, Spain. According to the 2004 census (INE), the municipality has a population of 97 inhabitants.

== See also ==
- Comunidad de Calatayud
- List of municipalities in Zaragoza
