= Alhama de Aragón =

- Municipality
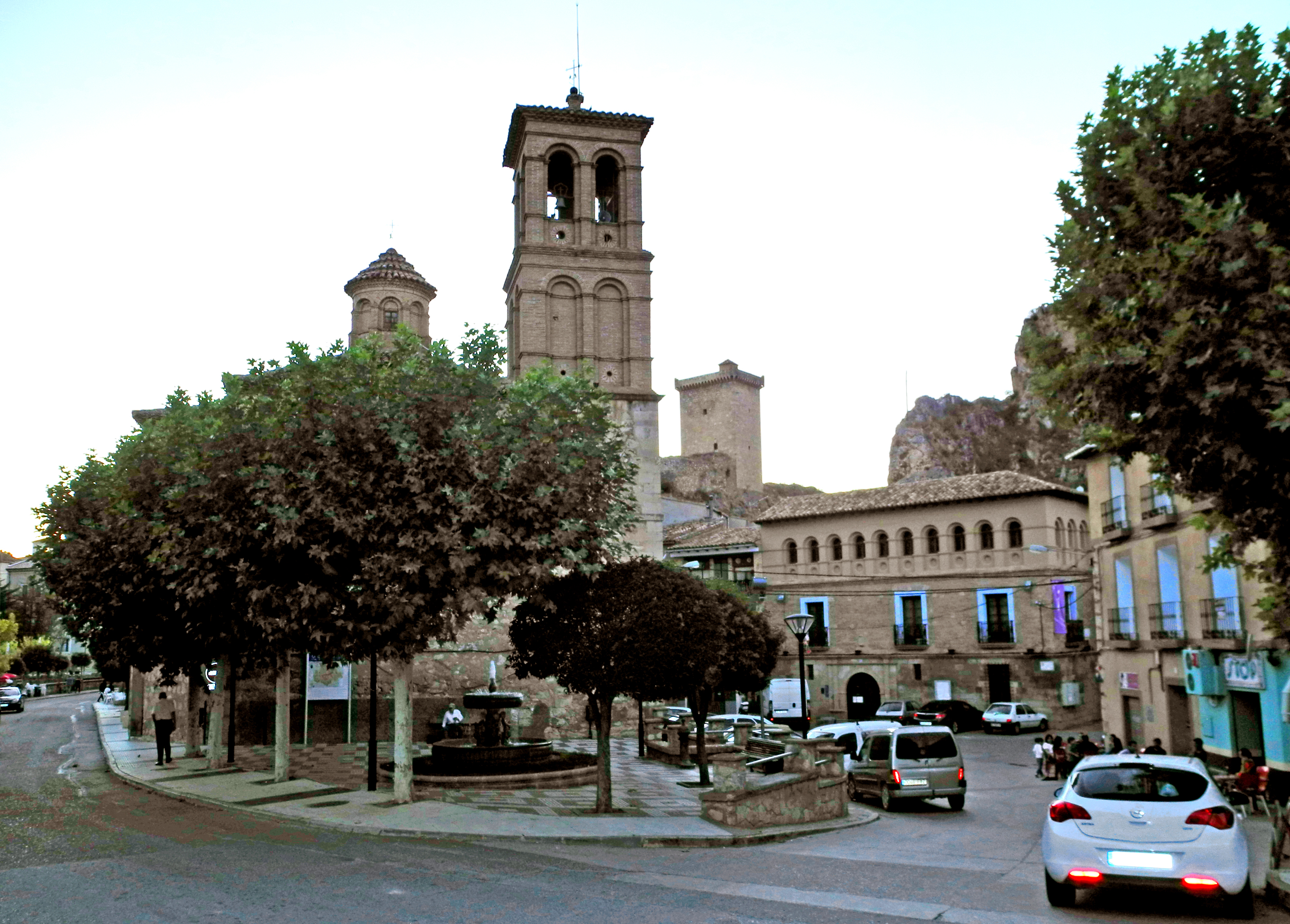
- View of Alhama de Aragón

- Flag Coat of arms

- Location within Spain
- Coordinates: 41°17′47.9″N 1°53′38.5″W
- Country: Spain
- A. community: Aragón
- Province: Zaragoza

Government
  - Mayor: María Pilar Marco

Area
  - Total: 31.14 km^{2} (12.02 sq mi)

Population (January 1, 2021)
  - Total: 996
  - Density: 31.98/km^{2} (82.8/sq mi)
- Time zone: UTC+01:00
- Postal code: 50230
- MCN: 50020
- Website: Official website

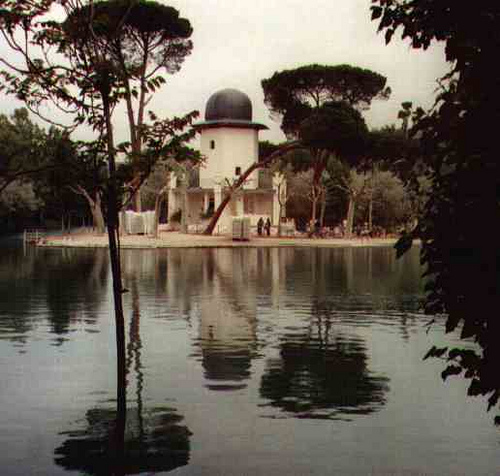
A thermal lake in the grounds of Termas Pallarés in Alhama de Aragón, Zaragoza, Spain.

Alhama de Aragón is a spa town located in the province of Zaragoza, Aragon, Spain, situated on the river Jalón, a tributary of the Ebro. According to the 2004 census (INE), the municipality has a population of 1,150 inhabitants.

Principal industries are the balnearios (spa hotels) and a lighting factory. There are extensive fruit farms and some wine-making in the area.

The town is served by railway services to Arcos de Jalón and Calatayud, where there is a connection to the high speed AVE trains between Madrid and Barcelona.

The 1957 film Los jueves, milagro (Every Thursday a Miracle), by Luis García Berlanga, starring Richard Basehart was filmed in the pueblo. Set in the fictional village of Fuentecilla, the story concerns a plot by local business men to revive the business of the spas by staging a miraculous appearance by San Dimas every Thursday evening.

== History ==
The town has been known for over two thousand years, primarily because of the hot springs of the area. The Roman poet Martial refers to its pre-Roman name as Congedus.

O you, whose name must not be left untold by Celtiberian nations, you the honour of our common country, Spain, you, Licinianus, will behold the lofty Bilbilis, renowned for horses and arms, and Catus venerable with his locks of snow, and eased Vadavero with ita broken cliffs, and the sweet grove of delicious Botrodus, which the happy Pomona loves. You will breast the gently-flowing water of the warm Congedus and the calm lakes of the Nymphs.

In the Roman era, it became known as Aquae Bilbilitanorum, a reference to the waters of Augusta Bilbilis, the Latin name for Calatayud. The modern name derives from the Arabic Al-Hammam, meaning "the baths". An Arab fortress was captured by El Cid in 1070, but it then reverted to Moorish control until re-captured by king Alfonso I of Aragón in 1122.

In the ensuing three centuries the town was disputed by the rulers of Castille and Aragon, finally becoming part of the latter in 1457. In the nineteenth century, the hot springs were exploited and several balnearios were built, four remaining in operation and popular with visitors today. During the Spanish Civil War, Alhama was quickly occupied by the Nationalists. During World War II, some escaped Allied prisoners or war were interned in the town, along with airmen who crashed in or near Spain.

== Attractions ==
A unique thermal lake of nearly two hectares is open throughout the year in the grounds of Balneario Termas Pallarés. The water is a constant temperature of 34 °C. The famous Cistercian abbey of Monasterio de Piedra with its water gardens lies approximately 25 kilometres to the south-west. The city of Calatayud which has famous mudéjar church towers is about 35 kilometres to the north east. Other examples of mudéjar art can be found in neighbouring villages.

== Fiestas ==
- La Virgen de las Candelas and San Blas, February 2–3
- Pilgrimage (romerio) to the hermitage of San Gregorio, 2nd Sunday in May
- Pilgrimage (romerio) to the hermitage of Santa Quiteria, May 22
- San Roque, August 14–17

== Notable people ==
- Pablo Luna Carné, (1879-1942), famous composer of zarzuelas.
- Ángel Vicioso, (1977-), racing cyclist

== Nearby ==
- Ariza
- Ateca
- Cetina
- Contamina
- Daroca
- Godojos

== See also ==
- List of municipalities in Zaragoza
