= Villalengua =

Coordinates: 41°26′N 1°50′W

- municipality
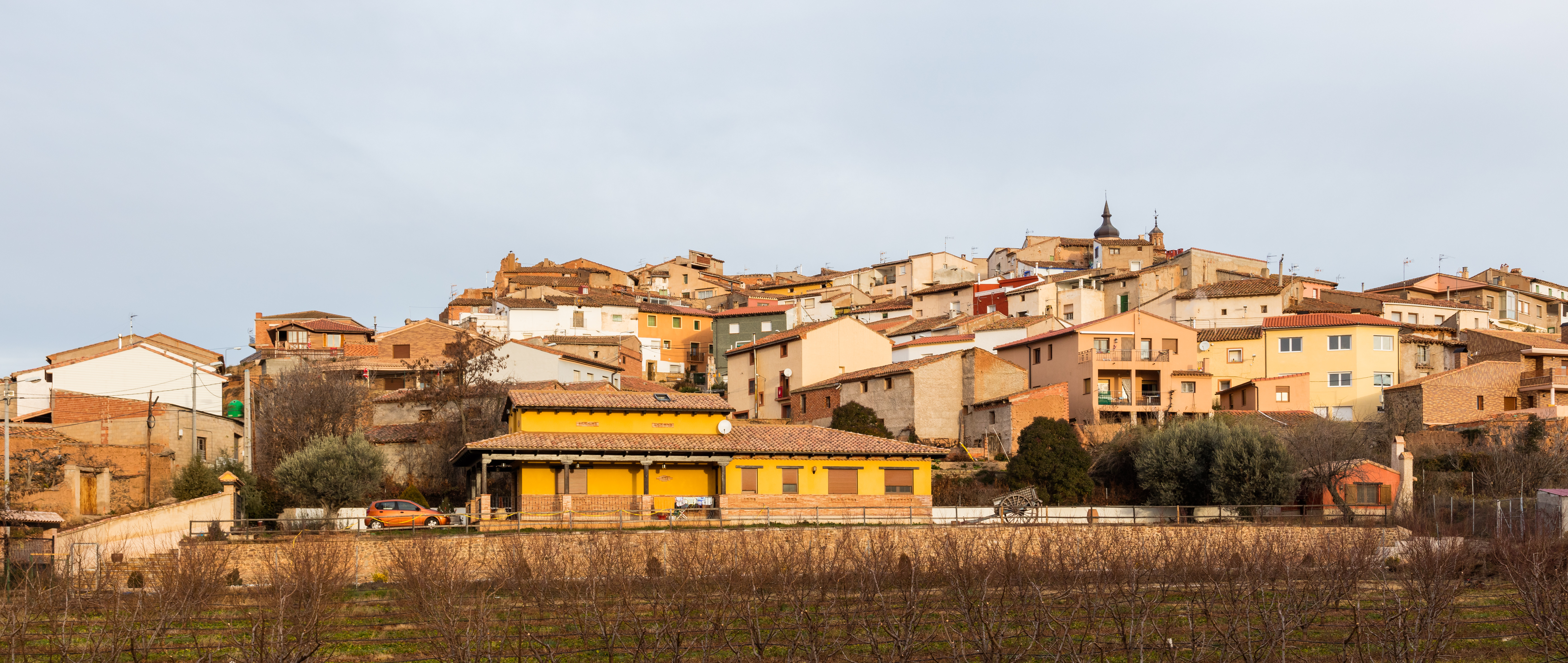

- Flag Coat of arms
- Interactive map of Villalengua
- Country: Spain
- Autonomous community: Aragon
- Province: Zaragoza
- Comarca: Comunidad de Calatayud

Area
  - Total: 40 km^{2} (15 sq mi)

Population (2025-01-01)
  - Total: 295
  - Density: 7.4/km^{2} (19/sq mi)
- Time zone: UTC+1 (CET)
  - Summer (DST): UTC+2 (CEST)

Villalengua is a municipality located in the Zaragoza Province, Aragon, Spain. According to the 2004 census (INE), the municipality had a population of 395 inhabitants.

== See also ==
- List of municipalities in Zaragoza
