= Paracuellos de la Ribera =

Coordinates: 41°26′N 1°33′W

- municipality
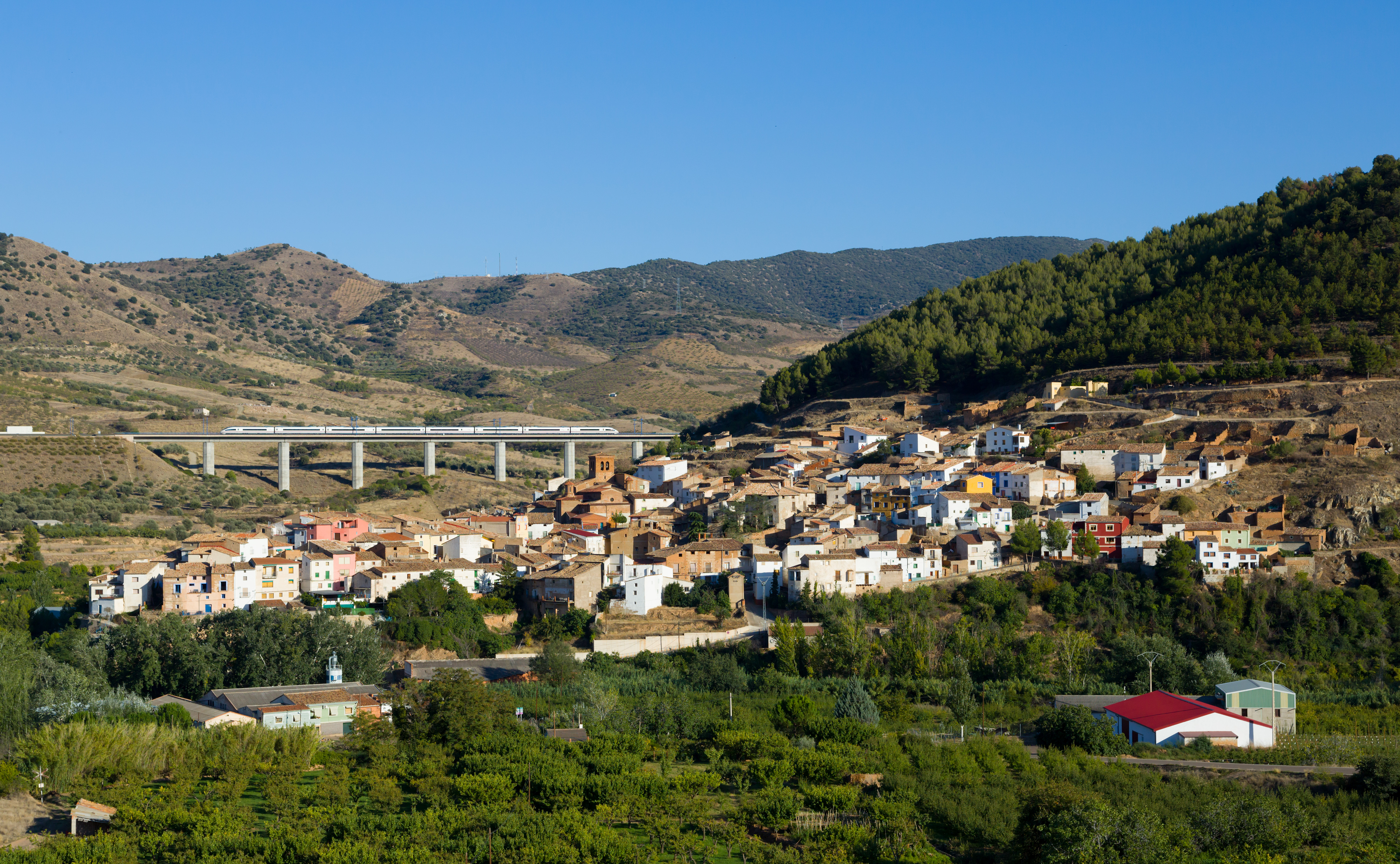
- Panoramic view of Paracuellos de la Ribera

- Flag Coat of arms
- Interactive map of Paracuellos de la Ribera
- Country: Spain
- Autonomous community: Aragon
- Province: Zaragoza
- Comarca: Comunidad de Calatayud

Area
  - Total: 14 km^{2} (5.4 sq mi)

Population (2025-01-01)
  - Total: 111
  - Density: 7.9/km^{2} (21/sq mi)
- Time zone: UTC+1 (CET)
  - Summer (DST): UTC+2 (CEST)

Paracuellos de la Ribera is a municipality located in the province of Zaragoza, Aragon, Spain. According to the 2010 census the municipality has a population of 194 inhabitants.

This town is located at the feet of the Sierra de Vicort range close to the Carretera Nacional N-II highway.

== See also ==
- Comunidad de Calatayud
- List of municipalities in Zaragoza
