= Bilbilis =

Ancient Roman city in Hispania Tarraconensis

Coordinates: 41°22′53″N 1°36′11″W

Augusta Bilbilis was a city (or municipium) founded by the Romans in the province of Hispania Tarraconensis. It was the birthplace of famous poet Martial c. 40 AD. The modern town of Calatayud was founded near this Roman site.

Recent excavations have uncovered many of the remains visible today which dominate the surrounding area and are testament to the city's rich past.

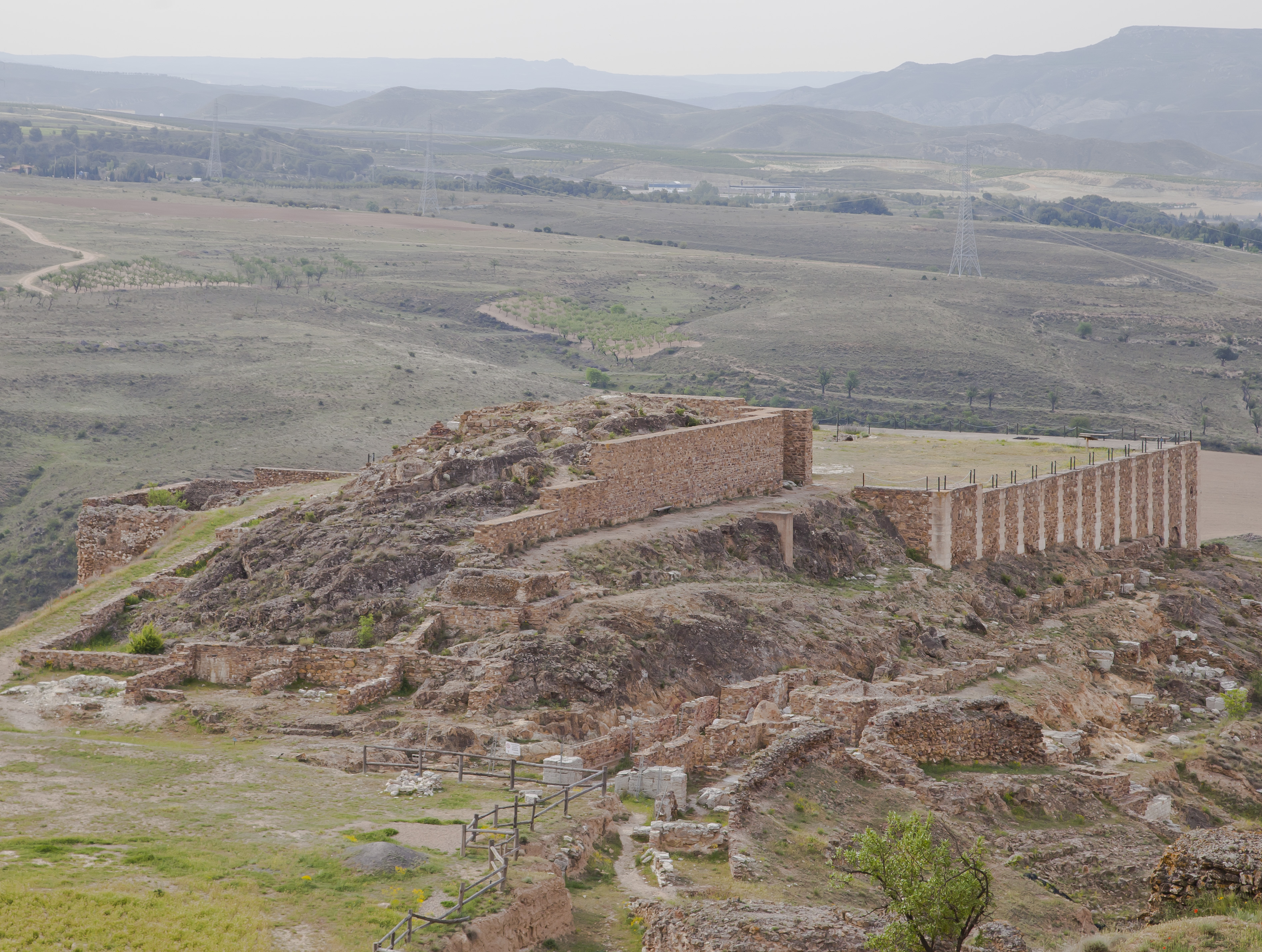
Forum

== History ==
=== Earliest phase and origins ===
The indigenous Celtiberian settlement of Bilbilis was situated on the heights of Cerro de Bambola and part of San Paterno, lying to the North of ancient Segeda and 60 km SW of the Roman colony of Col. Caesaraugusta (modern Zaragoza) in NE internal Spain. Bilbilis was famous for its metalworking.

Neighbouring towns in antiquity

Its inhabitants belonged to the group of the Celtic tribes of Hispania Citerior known as the Lusones tribe, of which Bilbilis was their capital. Their earliest coin issue includes a male head facing right, with dolphin to the left of the portrait on the obverse, while the reverse depicts a horseman carrying a spear and the inscription Bilbilis. These date from the late 2nd to the early 1st century BC and a number of these form part of the Iberian coin collection in the British Museum.

The first contact between the eventual conquerors of the area, the Romans, and the Lusones occurred around the 2nd century BC, when Quintus Fulvius Flaccus journeyed from the Mediterranean coast of Spain into the hinterland, a region referred to as Celtiberia. It was not until the 1st century, however, that Roman culture, language and customs, gradually began to spread into the hinterland with the indigenous cultures taking on many and varied aspects of Roman life while still maintaining aspects of their own distinct cultures.

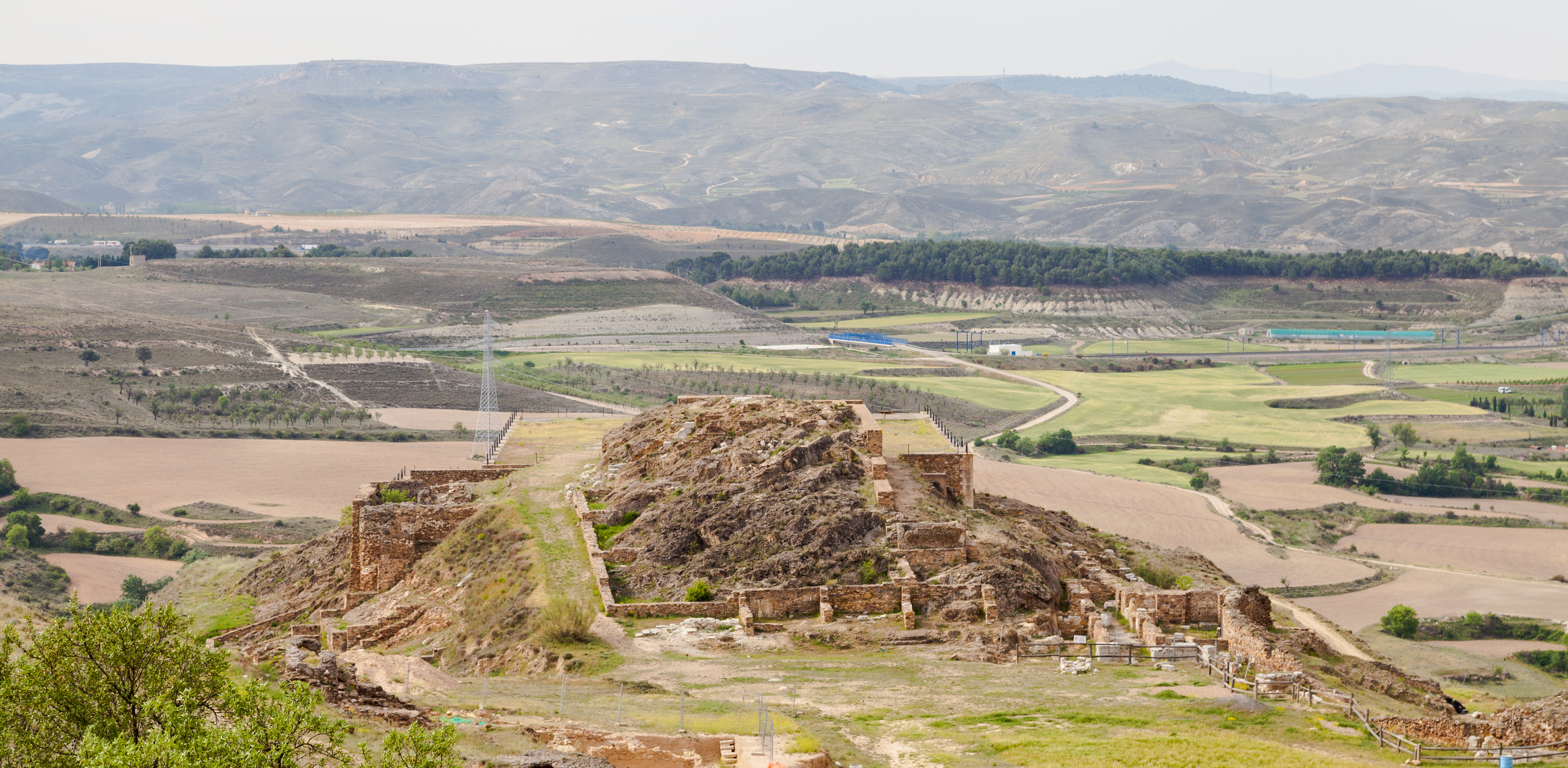
Wall and remains of buildings.

=== The development of the city ===
With the pacification of Hispania and the death of Julius Caesar, Augustus embarked on a series of administrative reforms including the Conventus of Bilbilis. The main road from Emerita Augusta to Caesaraugusta passed near and benefitted Bilbilis. The city was given the status of Municipium becoming Augusta Bilbilis and thus enjoyed the many privileges under Roman law, including bestowing Roman citizenship on all its inhabitants. Monumentalisation of civic and urban spaces characterise the Augustan period.

Coins were also minted in the city with "Augusta Bilbilis" on the reverse along with the governor's name. There were 10 minted under Augustus, four under Tiberius and one under Caligula. The most intriguing coin is one naming Lucius Aelius Sejanus as consul on which COS (consul) was stamped inside a garland of oak leaves (the corona civica) under Tiberius on the reverse.

The town must have flourished with Sejanus as benefactor, but was ultimately hurt with his demise when he was proved to be a traitor. All statues and monuments were subject to "damnatio memoriae" along with the coinage. Most of the coins were of the "as" or semis variety which were filed or stamped to erase his name from memory. Some very rare coins have his name still legible.

The famous and eminent poet Martial was born in Bilbilis in 38–41 AD and romanticised his provincial upbringing. He often praised his own country in his poems, for example the sulphurous springs of Aquae Bilbilitanorum situated approximately 24 km west on the Roman main road which are still used as spas (Alhama de Aragón). One of his finest poems celebrates a visit by his friend and fellow citizen Licinianus to Bilbilis. He moved to Rome when he was twenty-four years old; he stayed there more than thirty-four years and then came back to Bilbilis for three years. Finally, he went back to Rome where he published his last book (10th) and died in the year 103 AD.

The city's heyday was the 1st century. It declined rapidly in the 2nd century AD and by the 3rd century it was half-deserted.

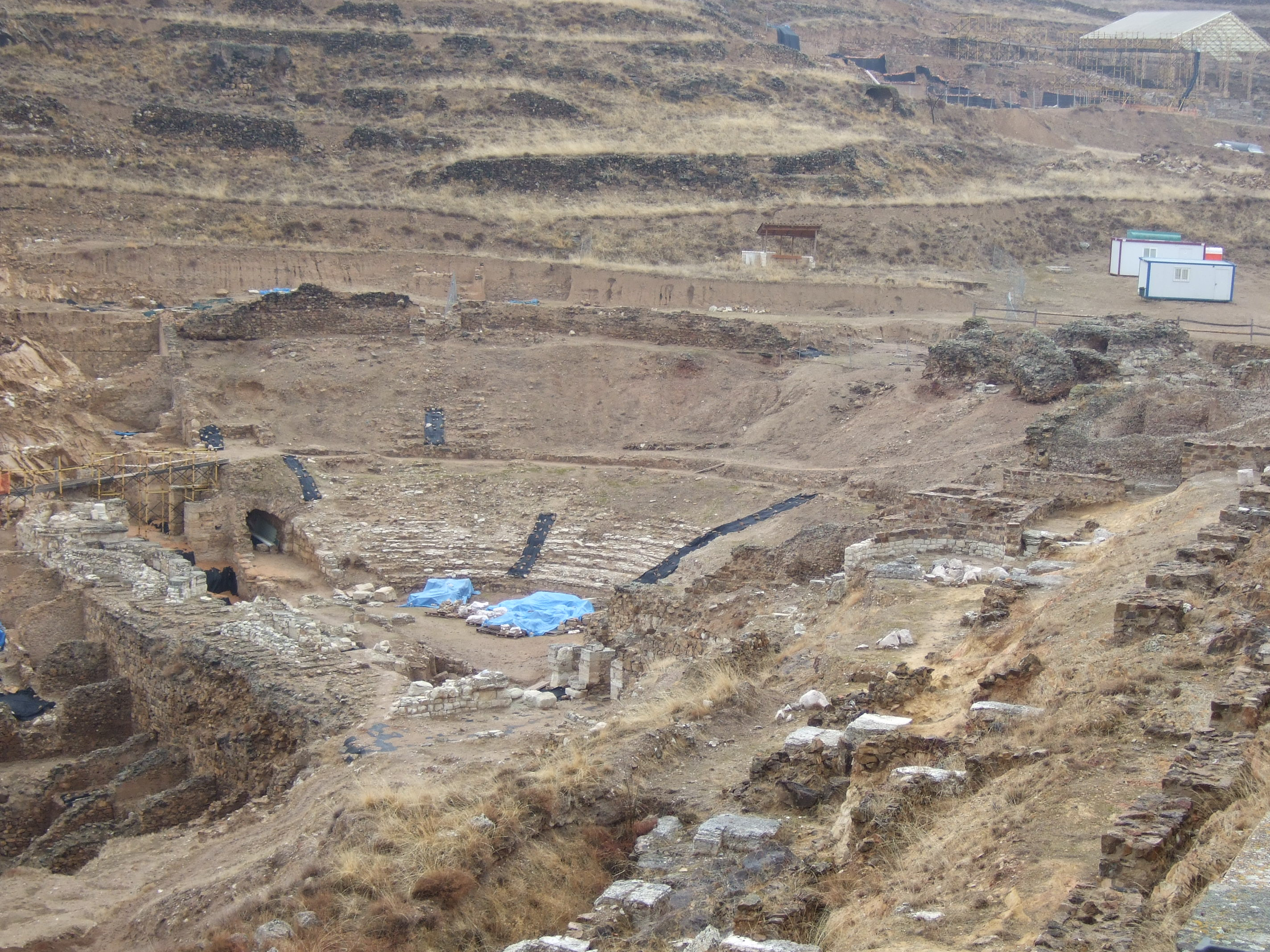
The theatre.

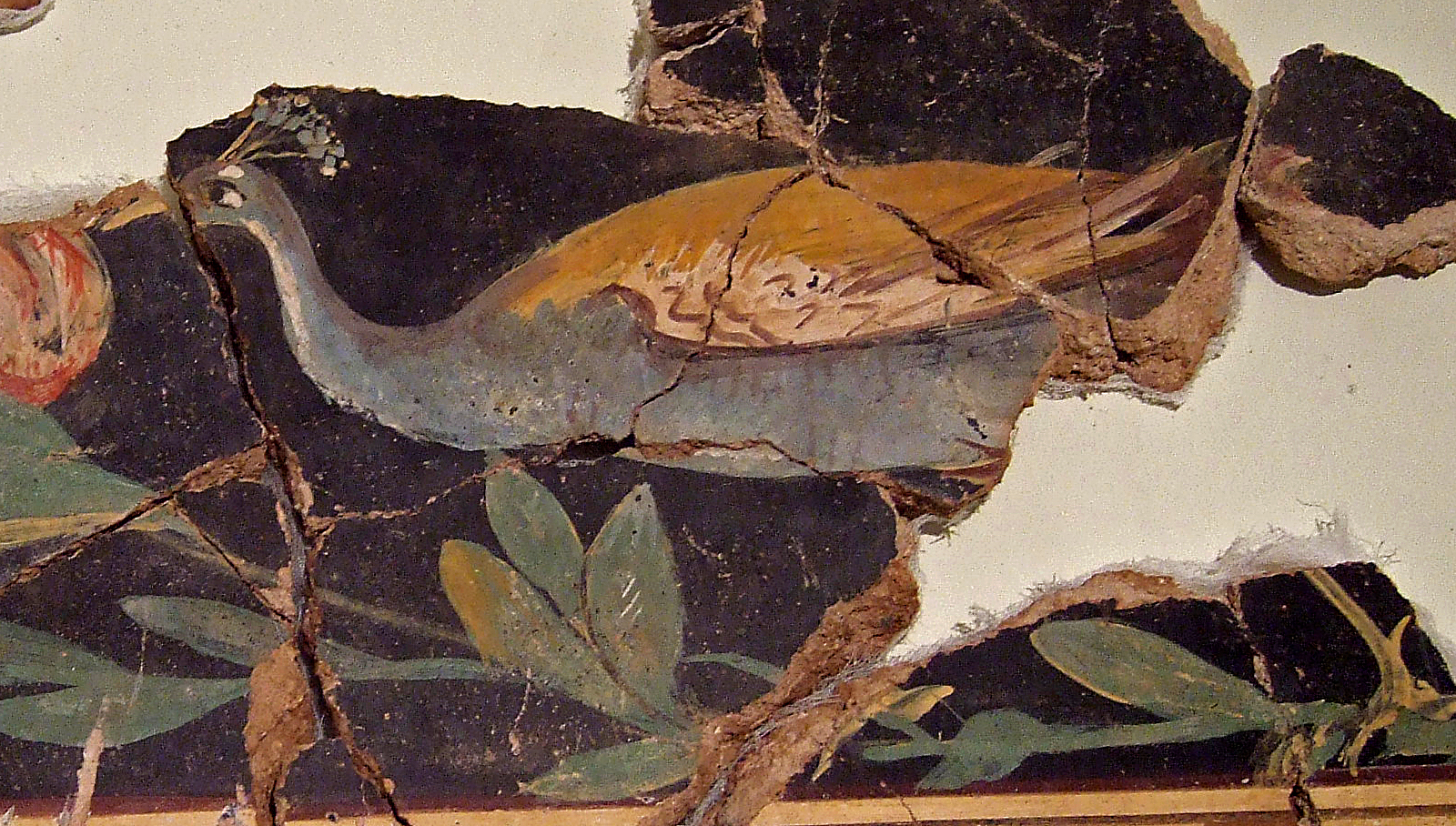
Fresco from domus 3, insula I, 1st c. BC (Catalayud Museum)

== The city and its buildings ==
The city was laid out in Roman fashion through many costly and complex construction projects. The topography of the terrain imposed a terraced layout with steep streets, hills and ramps, in contrast to the usual rectangular grid of a Roman town. Communication between terraces was achieved through ramps for people and vehicles to move through twisting paths adapted to the slope of the hills.

The new buildings allowed the Municipium to become the political, administrative, economic and social centre of the region. To perform these functions an urban complex consisting of arcaded square, temple, basilica and curia, and theatre was built. Baths were also built, and a complex nymphaeum based on a network of hydraulic tanks adapted to the contour of the land that provided the city with a permanent water supply.

The middle part of the city was reserved for the main monuments, the forum and theatre. Towards this area converged the two main access roads from the gates located in the city walls, one next to the river Jalón and another near the theatre.

Many beautiful frescoes from the thermae (baths) and from town houses (domus) can be seen in the Museo de Calatayud.

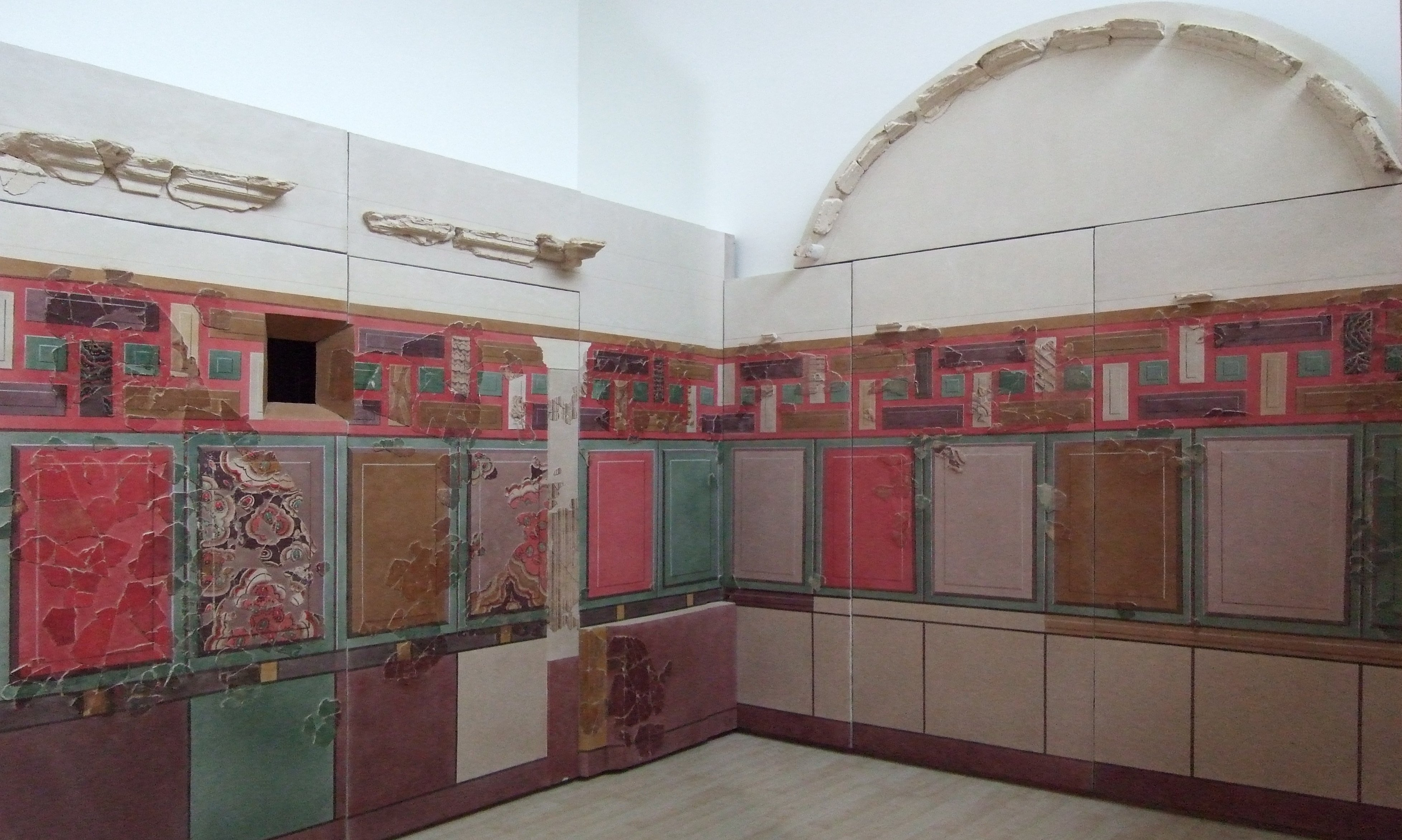
Cubiculum (bedroom) from Domus 2, Insula I, 50 BC (Calatayud Museum)

=== The forum ===
The forum is a practically square area located in front of the temple in the upper part of the city and is decorated with marble and statues, and framed by porticos, a basilica, curia, and crypto-porticus.

It was completed during the reign of Emperor Tiberius, although there were subsequent changes in the Trajanic period.

=== The theatre ===
The theatre was conceived as a whole with the forum to which it is linked by a series of gates and corridors. Its layout has two floors with Corinthian capitals on both, and takes advantage of the natural terrain. It must have been intended for shows of regional character, since its capacity of around 4,500 spectators far exceeds the needs of the small town estimated to have had 3,500 inhabitants.

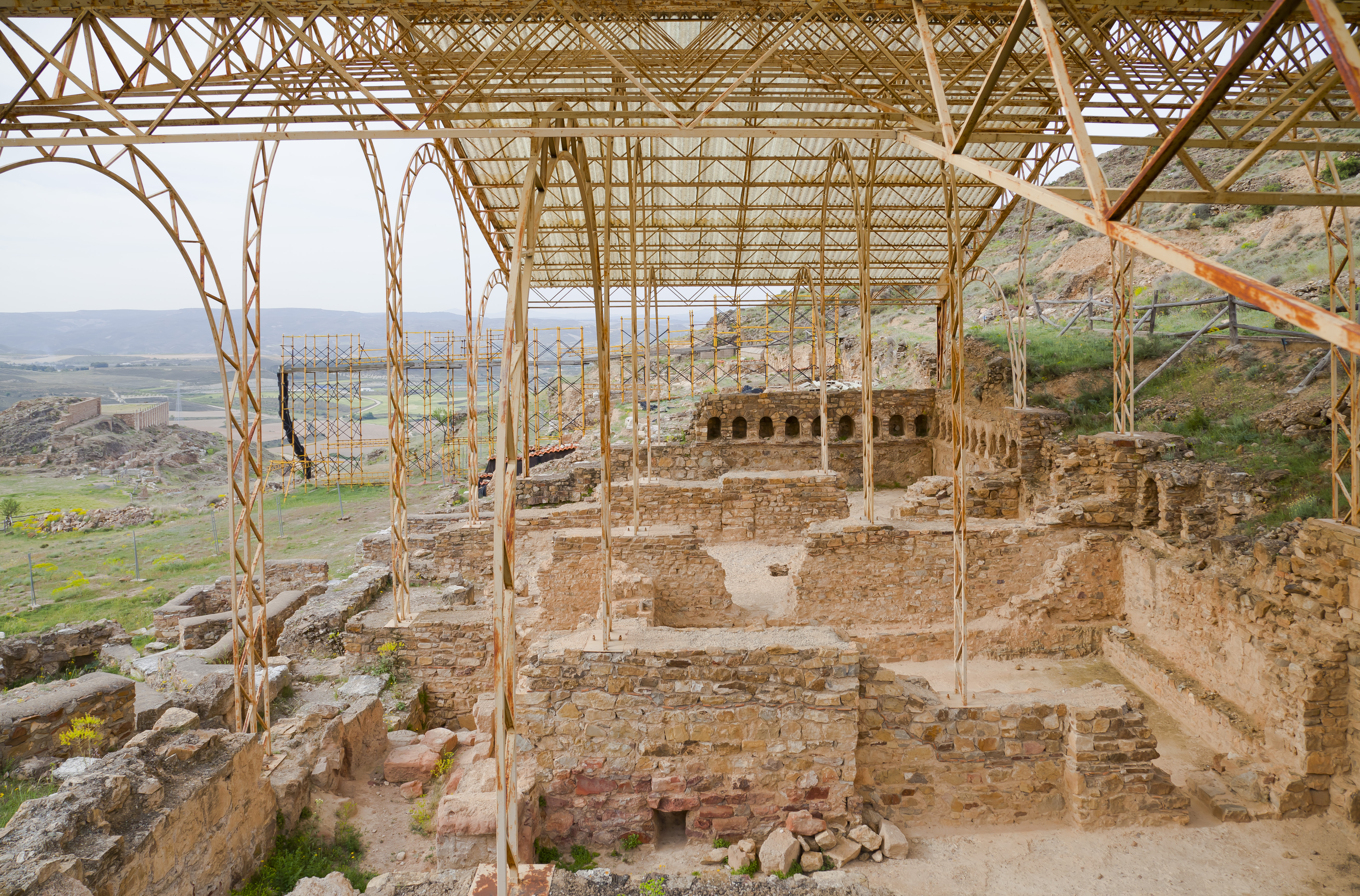
Thermal baths

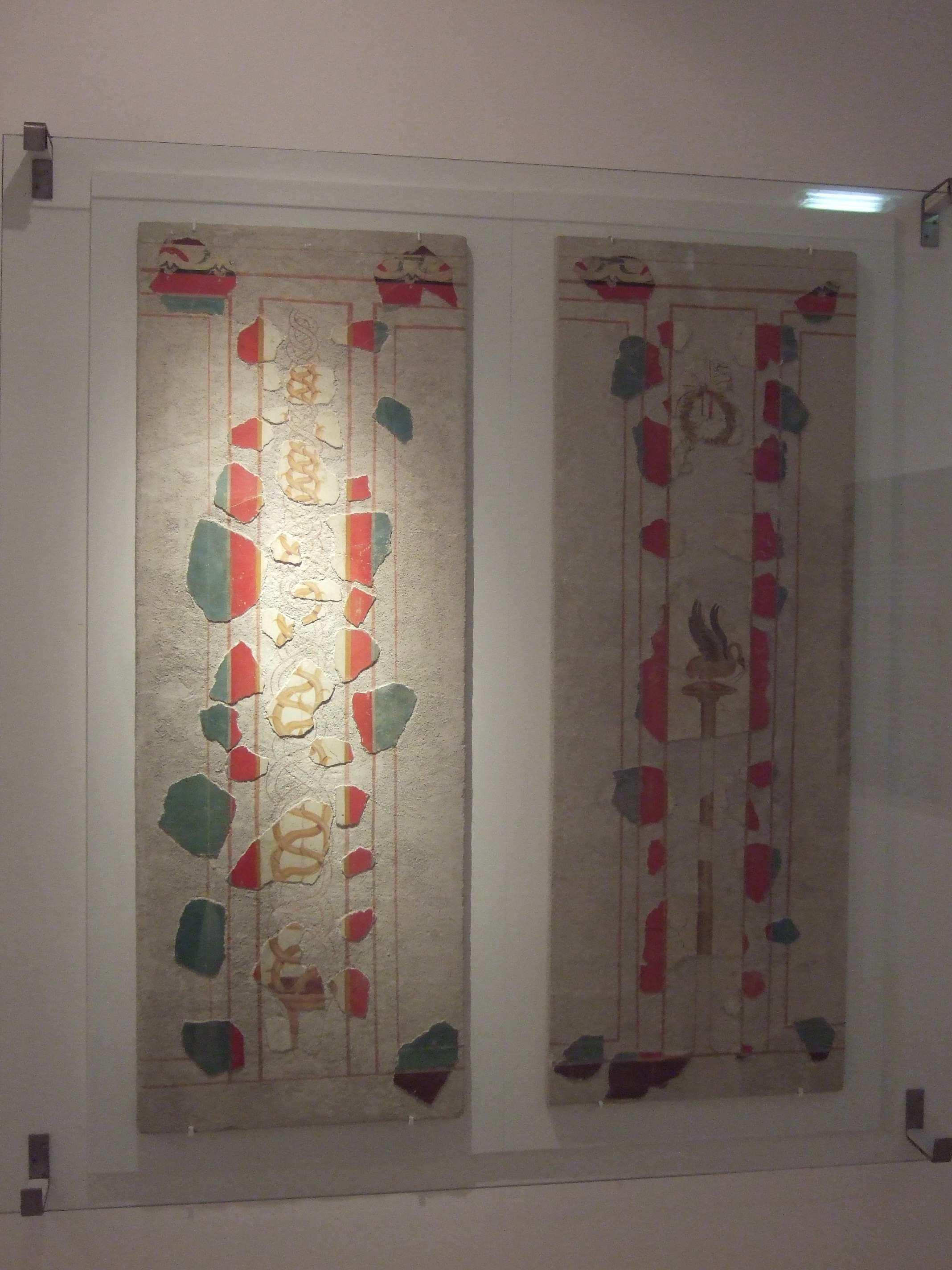
Fresco from the thermae (Calatayud Museum)

=== The baths ===
These are situated on a hillside and surrounded by several cisterns that supplied water. The rooms of these springs consisted of a raised pool in the caldarium, latrines etc. Many rooms were decorated with high quality frescoes probably made by a team of Italian artists who toured several places in the Ebro valley.

== Exhibits in the Museum of Calatayud ==
Much of the contents of the Museum of Calatayud consists of archaeological remains from Bilbilis. These include picture groups, the coin collection from the mint and a sculpture collection of portraits of the Julio-Claudian imperial family that had been found in the theatre area. Among them of particular interest is the Augustus "capite velato" found in 2009, one of the few examples of this official portrait found in Hispania.

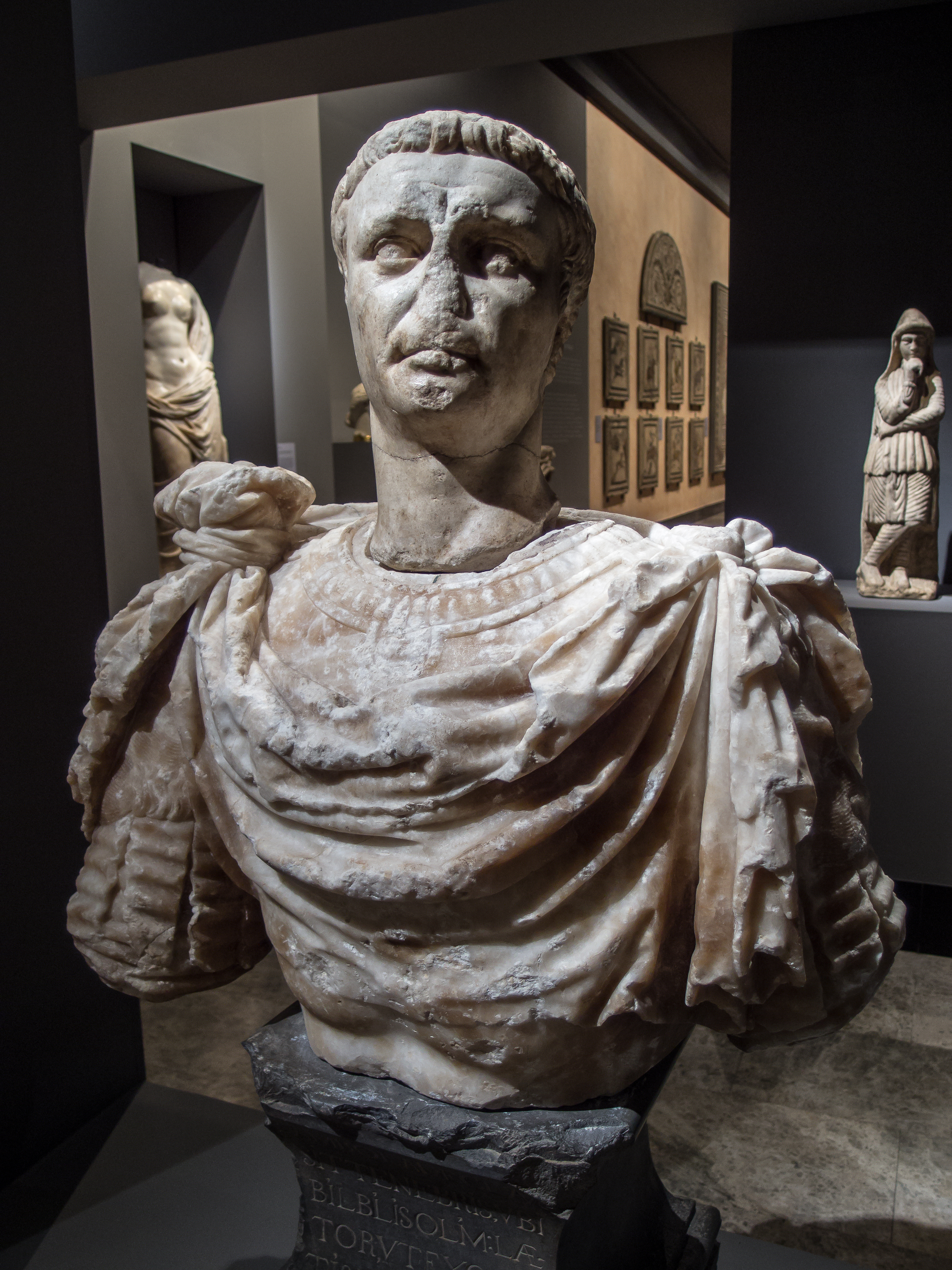
Marble bust of emperor Claudius (41-51 AD) from Bilbilis (Zaragoza museum
