= Munébrega =

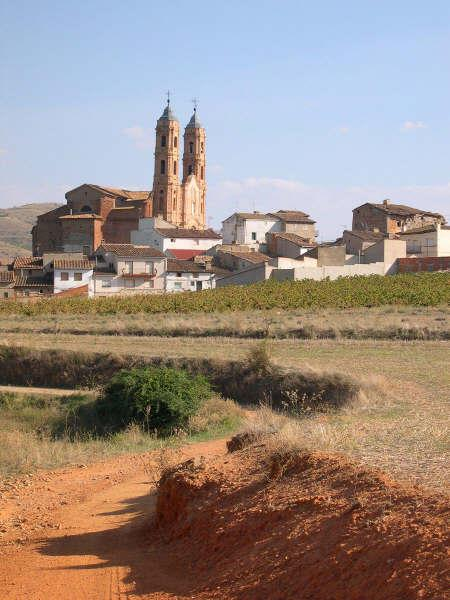

- Flag Coat of arms

- Location in Spain. Munébrega (Spain) Munébrega (Europe)
- Coordinates: 41°15′N 1°42′W
- Country: Spain
- Autonomous community: Aragon
- Province: Zaragoza
- Comarca: Comunidad de Calatayud

Area
  - Total: 40.99 km^{2} (15.83 sq mi)

Population (2025-01-01)
  - Total: 351
  - Density: 8.56/km^{2} (22.2/sq mi)
- Demonym: Munebreganos or Zarandillos
- Time zone: UTC+1 (CET)
  - Summer (DST): UTC+2 (CEST)
- Website: Official website

Munébrega is a municipality located in the province of Zaragoza, Aragon, eastern Spain.

== See also ==
- List of municipalities in Zaragoza
