= Belmonte de Gracián =

Belmonte de Gracián Belmón de Grazián
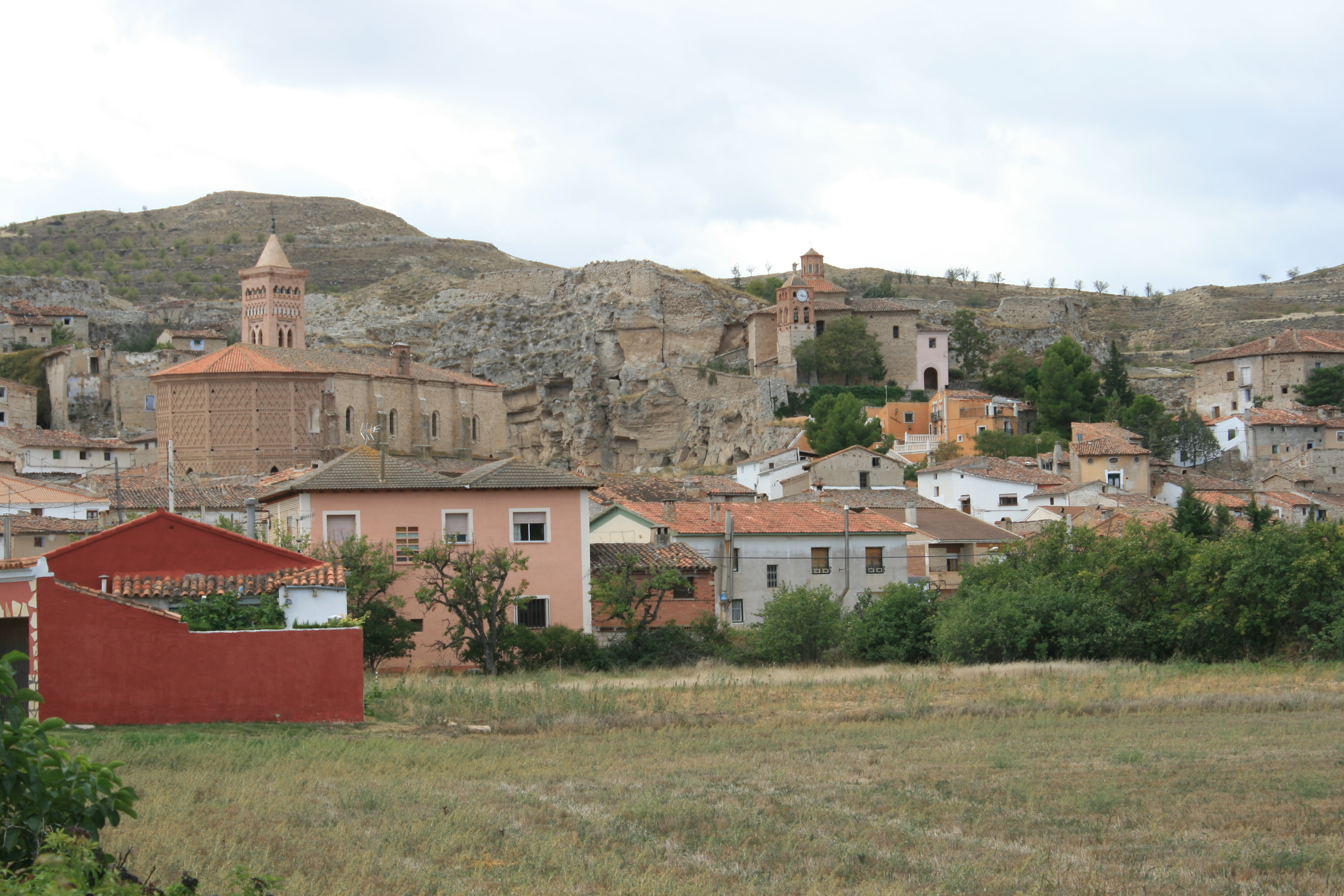

- Flag Coat of arms

- Location in Spain. Belmonte de Gracián (Spain)
- Coordinates: 41°18′58″N 1°32′35″W
- Country: Spain
- Autonomous community: Aragon
- Province: Zaragoza
- Comarca: Comunidad de Calatayud

Area
  - Total: 43.7 km^{2} (16.9 sq mi)
- Elevation: 646 m (2,119 ft)

Population (2025-01-01)
  - Total: 183
  - Density: 4.19/km^{2} (10.8/sq mi)
- Demonym: Belmontinos
- Time zone: UTC+1 (CET)
  - Summer (DST): UTC+2 (CEST)
- Website: www.belmontedegracian.es

Belmonte de Gracián (Aragonese: Belmón de Grazián) is a village near Calatayud in the province of Zaragoza in Aragon, Spain. It is a fortified village which sits at the foot of a 15th-century castle.

It is the birthplace of Baltasar Gracián y Morales, and in 1985 was renamed to Belmonte de Gracián in his honour. Previously the town was known as Belmonte de Calatayud and Belmonte del Río Perejiles.

The archaeological remains of the Celtiberian and Romano-Celtiberian town of Segeda-Sekeiza are located between Belmonte de Gracián and the nearby town of Mara.

== Main sights ==
- Castle, with an oval plan
- Church of St. Michael (15th century), in Gothic style. It has a Mudéjar bell tower.
- Hermitage of the Castle
- Watch Tower (10th century)
- Fortified Palace (14th century)

== See also ==
- List of municipalities in Zaragoza
