= Calatayud (DO) =

Spanish regional wine designation

Coordinates: 41°39′N 0°53′W

Calatayud DOP
- Wine region
- Calatayud DOP in the province of Zaragoza in the region of Aragon
- Official name: D.O.P Calatayud
- Type: Denominación de Origen Protegida (DOP)
- Year established: 1990
- Country: Spain
- No. of vineyards: 3,200 hectares (7,907 acres)
- No. of wineries: 15
- Wine produced: 100,452 hectolitres
- Comments: Data for 2016 / 2017

The 4 DO wine regions in the region of Aragon, (Spain)

Calatayud is a Spanish Denominación de Origen Protegida (DOP) for wines located in the southwestern corner of the province of Zaragoza (Aragón, Spain) about 90 km from Zaragoza and covers over 5,600 ha, extending over 46 different municipalities, including Calatayud itself. It borders with the Cariñena (DO) in the east and with the province of Soria in the west. It is in the Ebro River valley and is crisscrossed by many of the Ebro's tributaries including the Jalón, Jiloca, Manubles, Mesa (river), Piedra and Ribota. The vineyards are found on the south facing slopes of the Sierra de la Virgen range at heights of between 550 m and 800 m above sea level.

== Climate ==
The climate is continental (hot dry summers and cold winters), the mean annual temperature does not exceed 13 °C, and there is a good probability of frost during six months of the year. The mean annual rainfall is between 300 mm and 500 mm per annum.

== Soils ==
Most of the vines are planted in soils that are stoney, loose, very poor in nutrients and with a high lime content. The permeability is good so the roots are able to obtain the water and nutrients they require.

== Authorised Grape varieties ==
The authorised grape varieties are:

- Red: Garnacha Tinta, Tempranillo, Mazuela, Monastrell, Cabernet Sauvignon, Merlot, Bobal, and Syrah
- White: Macabeo, Malvasía, Moscatel de Alejandría, Garnacha Blanca, Chardonnay, Sauvignon Blanc, and Gewürztraminer
