= Arándiga =

Arándiga, Spain
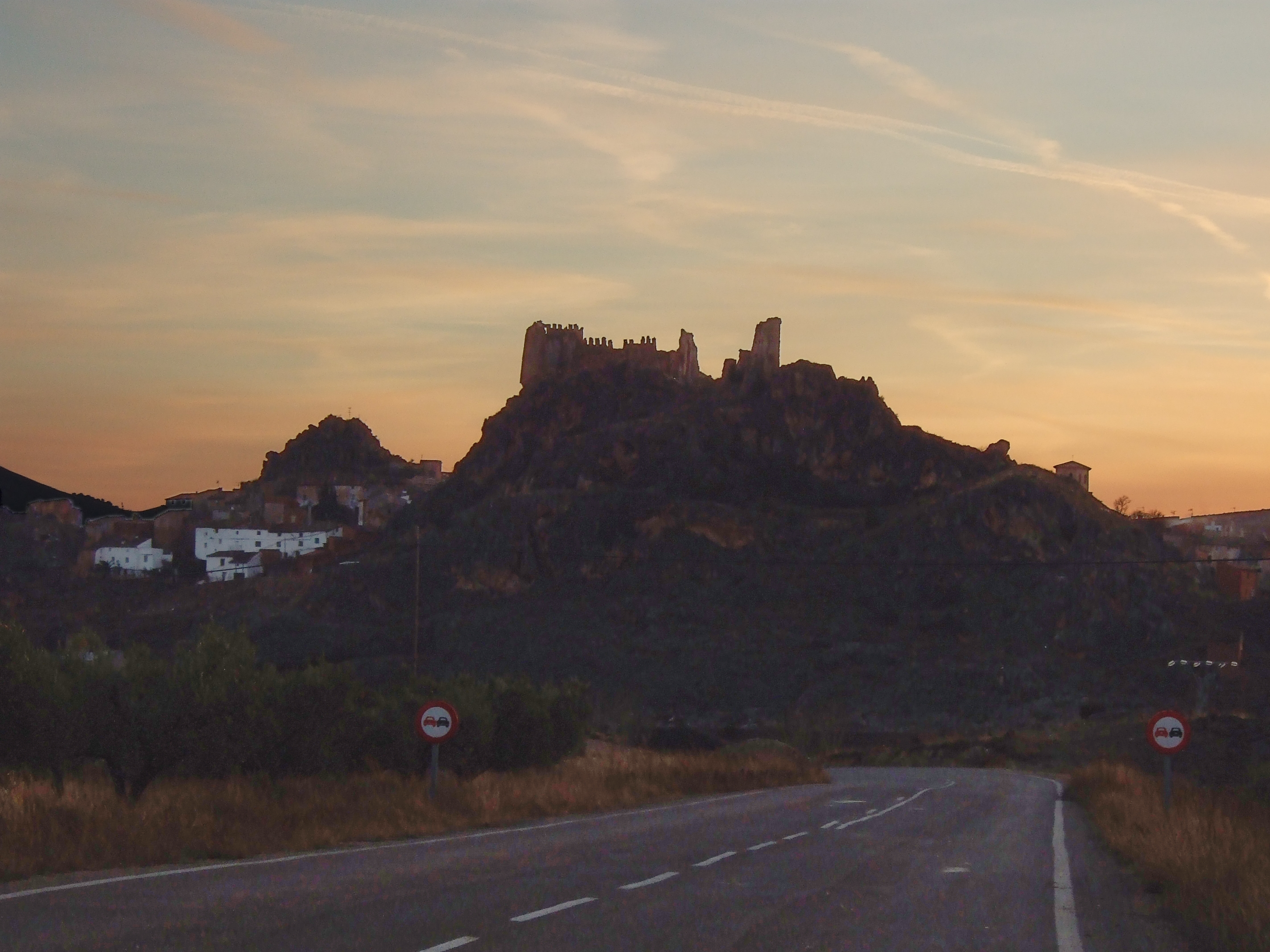

- Flag Coat of arms

- Location within Aragon Location within Spain Location within Europe
- Country: Spain
- Autonomous community: Aragon
- Province: Zaragoza
- Comarca: Comunidad de Calatayud

Area
  - Total: 50 km^{2} (19 sq mi)
- Elevation: 462 m (1,516 ft)

Population (2025-01-01)
  - Total: 279
  - Density: 5.6/km^{2} (14/sq mi)
- Time zone: UTC+1 (CET)
  - Summer (DST): UTC+2 (CEST)

Arándiga is a municipality located in the province of Zaragoza, Aragon, Spain. According to the 2004 census (INE), the municipality has a population of 472 inhabitants.

== History ==
Possibly ancient Aratikos or Aratis, an ancient Iberian settlement of which little is known, but was located somewhere to the SW of the Roman colony of Caesaraugusta the Modern day city of Zaragoza. It issued coins in the Late 2nd century BC with the Iberian inscription aratikos and these present a Male head, right on the obverse, and a horseman carrying a spear, right, on the reverse. The Barrington Atlas of the ancient world equates this site with modern Arándiga.

== See also ==
- Comunidad de Calatayud
- List of municipalities in Zaragoza
