= Maluenda =

Coordinates: 41°17′N 1°37′W

Maluenda, Spain
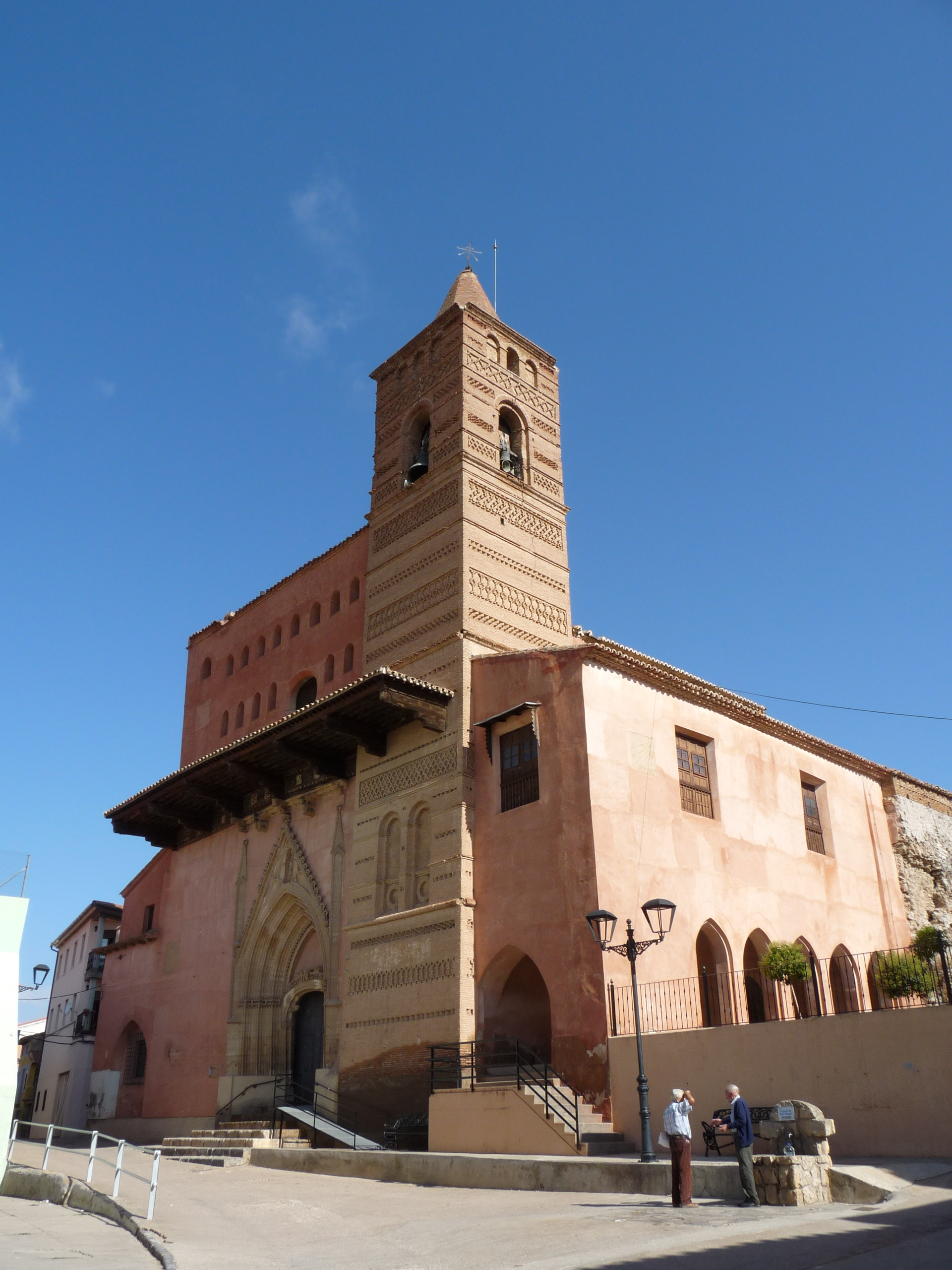

- Flag Coat of arms
- Interactive map of Maluenda, Spain
- Country: Spain
- Autonomous community: Aragon
- Province: Zaragoza
- Municipality: Maluenda

Area
  - Total: 39 km^{2} (15 sq mi)
- Elevation: 581 m (1,906 ft)

Population (2025-01-01)
  - Total: 895
  - Density: 23/km^{2} (59/sq mi)
- Time zone: UTC+1 (CET)
  - Summer (DST): UTC+2 (CEST)
- Website: http://www.maluenda.es/

Maluenda is a municipality in the province of Zaragoza, Aragon, Spain. According to the 2004 census (INE), the municipality has a population of 1,020 inhabitants.

== Architectural Heritage ==
Maluenda is representative of the Moorish style in Spain, particularly that of the Jiloca valley. Exhibits of this are the castle and the defensive tower, together with the local churches of Mudéjar tradition.

== Politics ==
In the 2007 municipal election, PP got 325 votes (50.08%, 5 seats in the municipal council), Spanish Socialist Workers' Party got 162 votes (24.96%, 2 seats) and the Aragonese Party got 150 votes (23.11% and 2 seats).

== Gallery ==
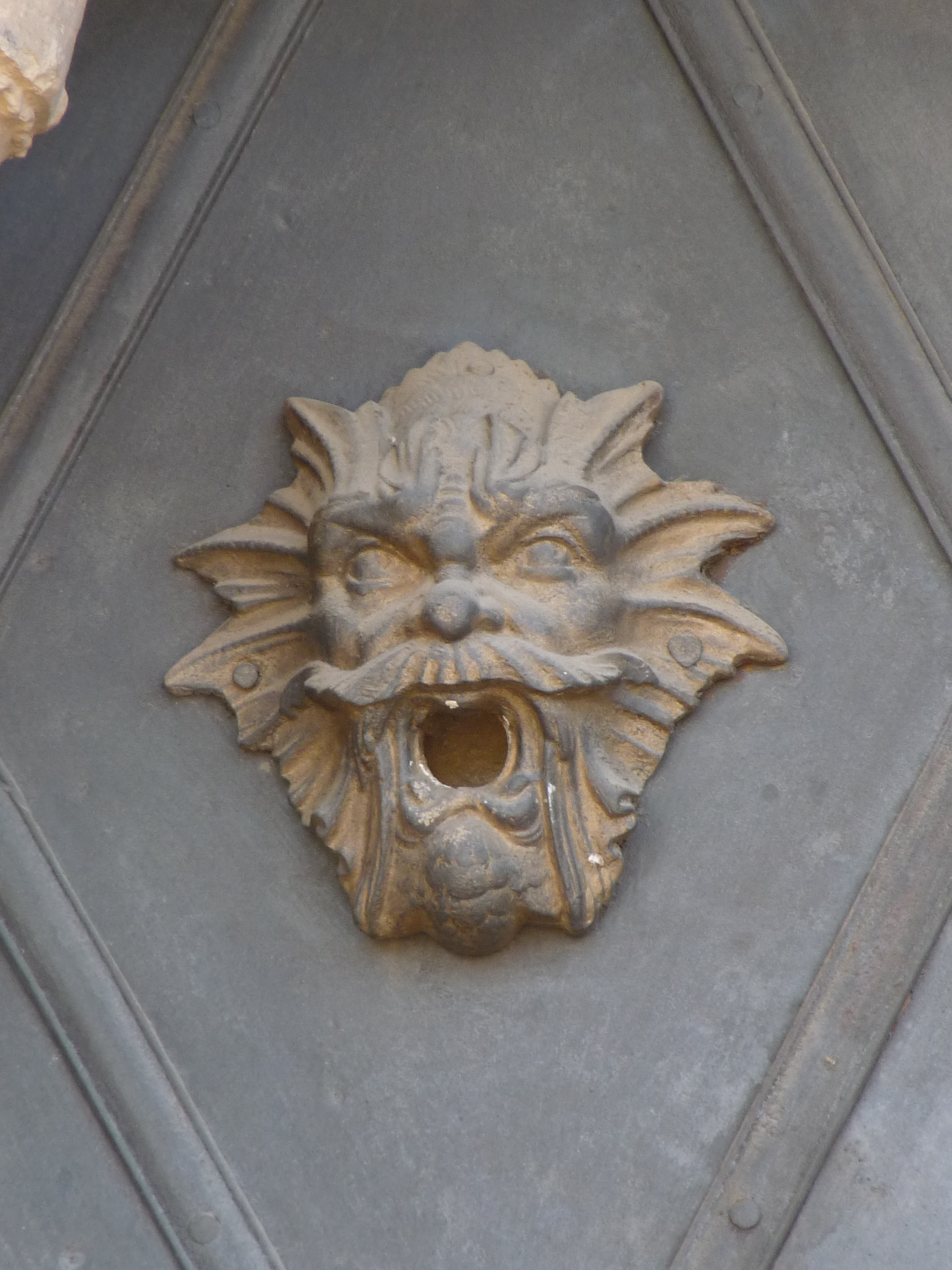
Mask, Santa Maria Church, Maluenda.

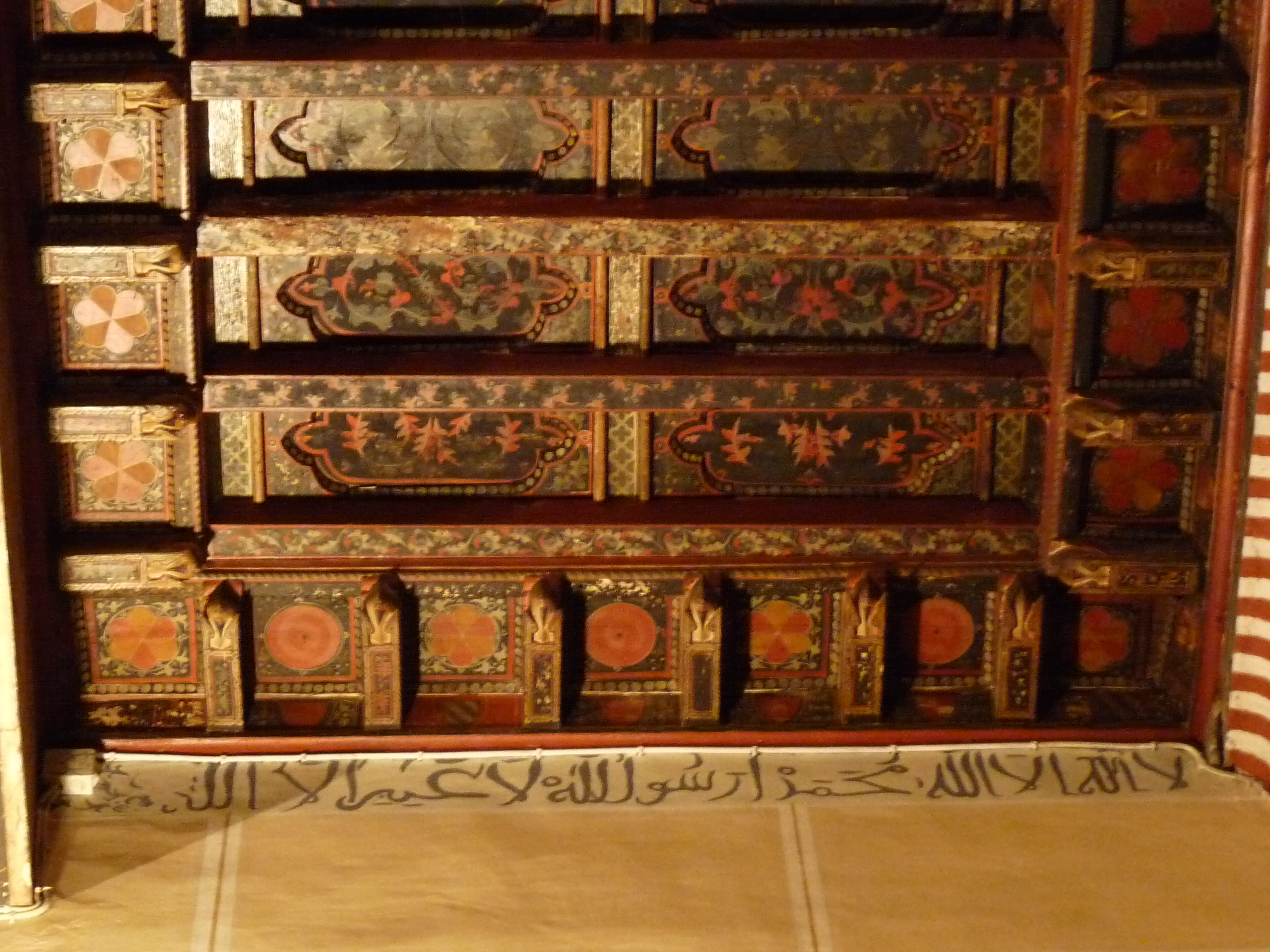
Santa Maria Church, Maluenda; note the Arabic writing.

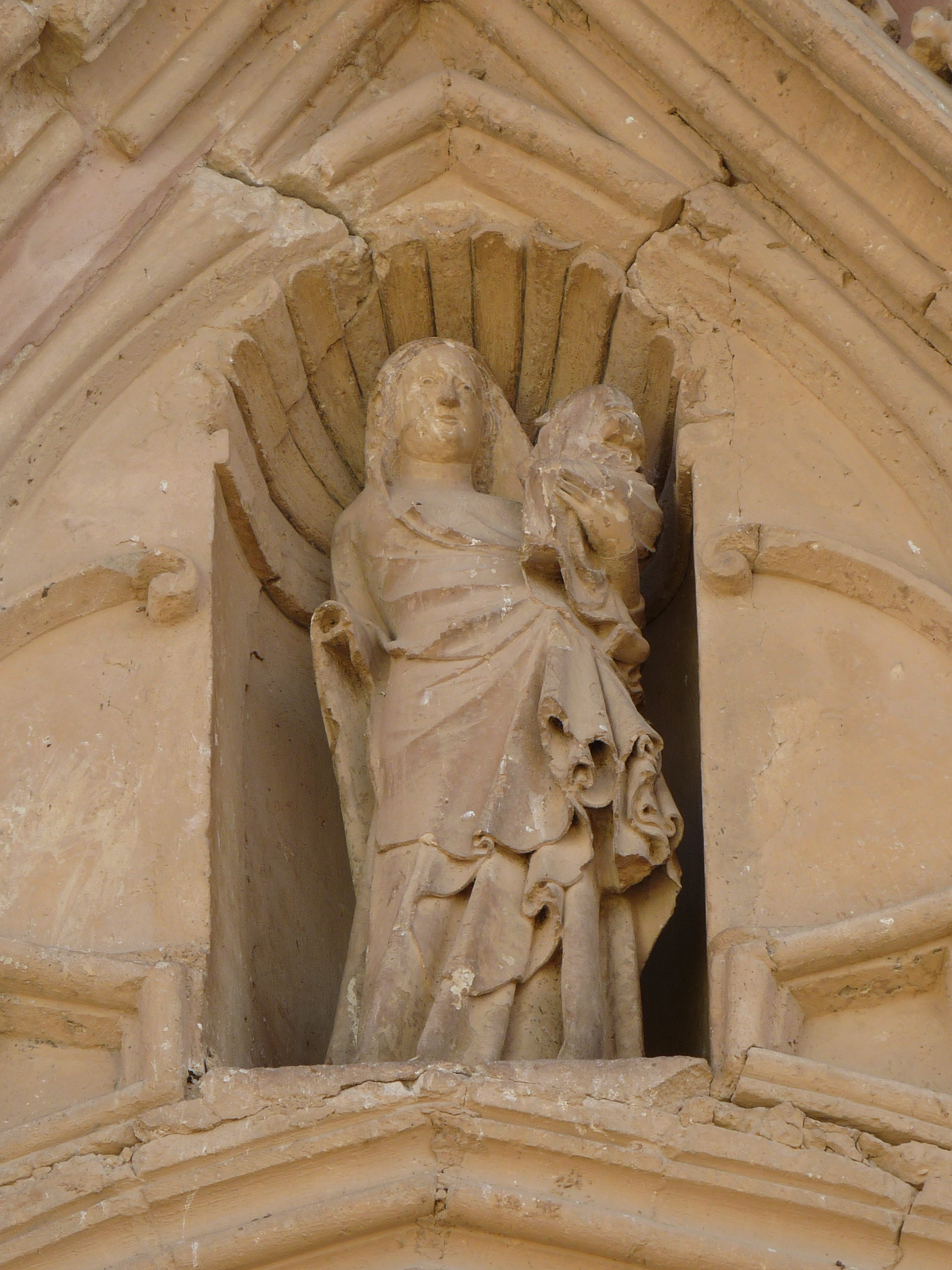
Santa Maria Church, statue of Saint Mary.

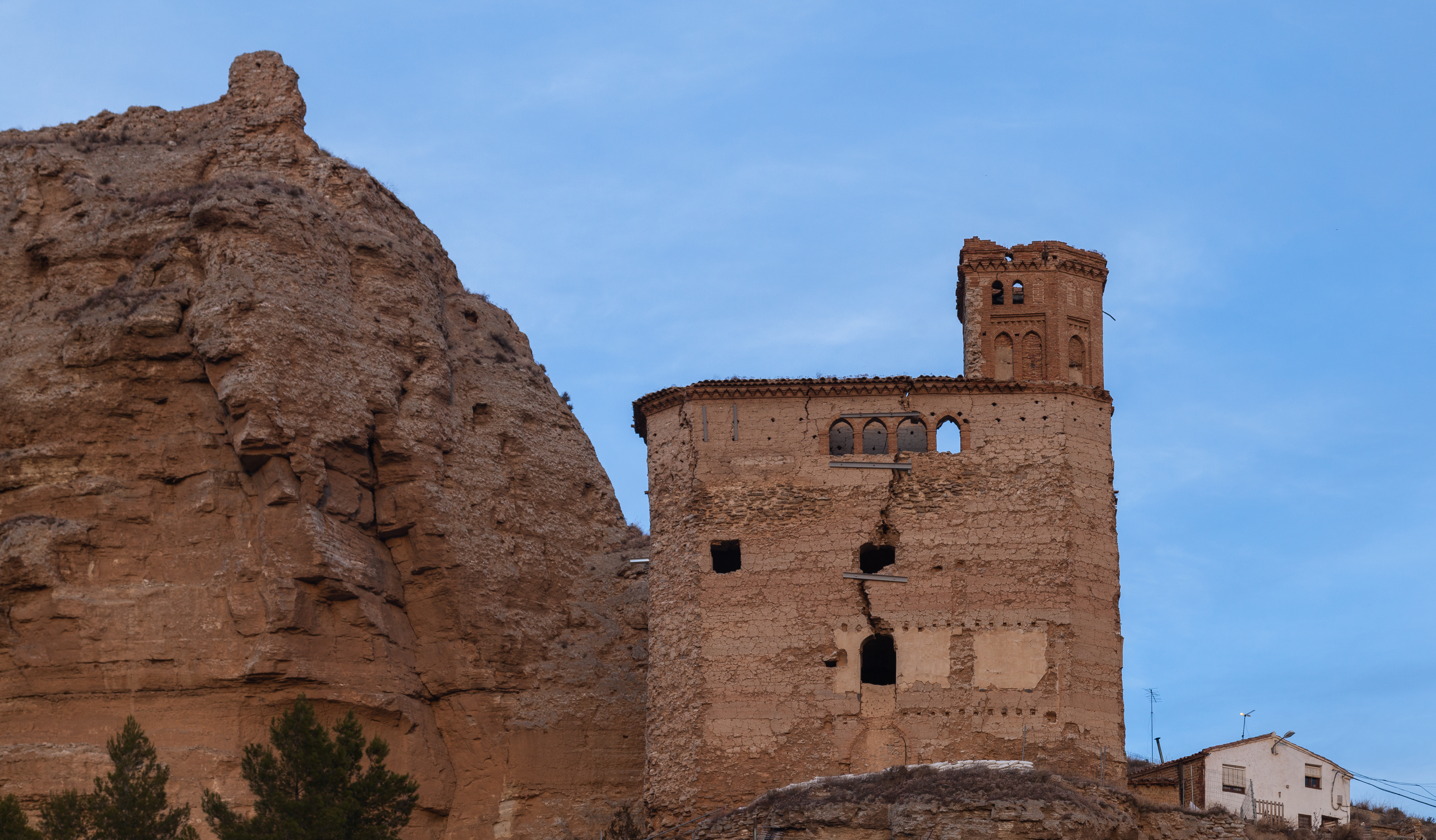
Castle.

== See also ==
- Ribera del Jiloca
- List of municipalities in Zaragoza
