= Jaraba =

- municipality
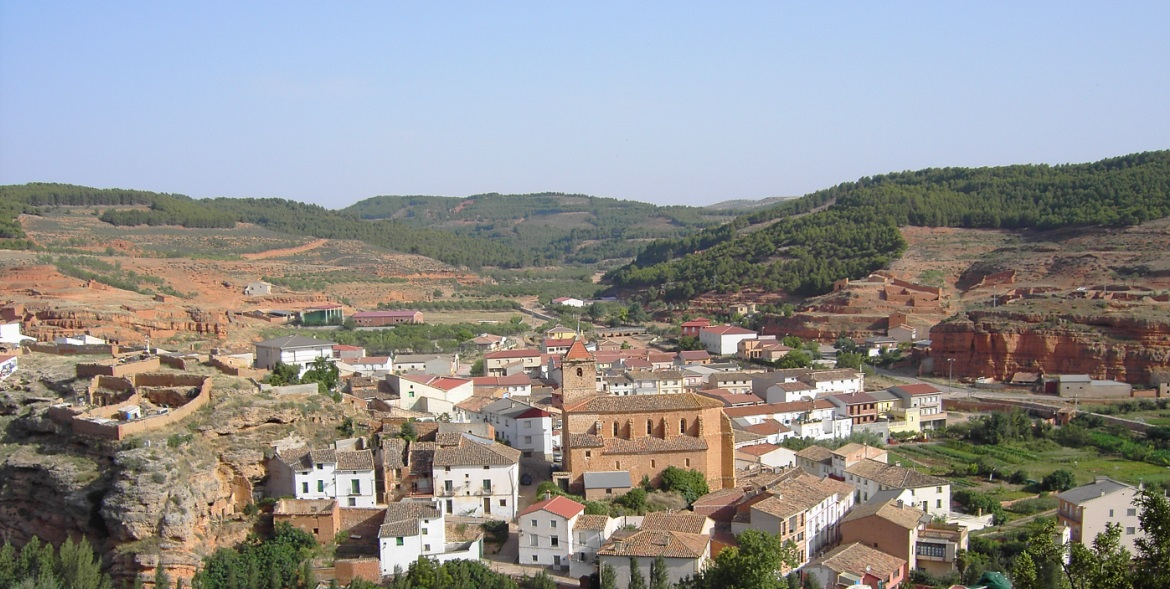

- Flag Coat of arms

- Location within Aragon Location within Spain Location within Europe
- Country: Spain
- Autonomous community: Aragon
- Province: Zaragoza
- Comarca: Comunidad de Calatayud

Area
  - Total: 42 km^{2} (16 sq mi)

Population (2025-01-01)
  - Total: 294
  - Density: 7.0/km^{2} (18/sq mi)
- Time zone: UTC+1 (CET)
  - Summer (DST): UTC+2 (CEST)

Jaraba is a municipality located in the province of Zaragoza, Aragon, Spain. According to the 2004 census (INE), the municipality has a population of 316 inhabitants.

This town is located in the deep Mesa River valley, at the feet of the Sierra de Solorio range, Sistema Ibérico. There are three spas in the municipality, two of which are located close to the river.

== See also ==
- Comunidad de Calatayud
- List of municipalities in Zaragoza
