= Villafeliche =

Coordinates: 41°12′N 1°30′W

- municipality
- Flag Coat of arms

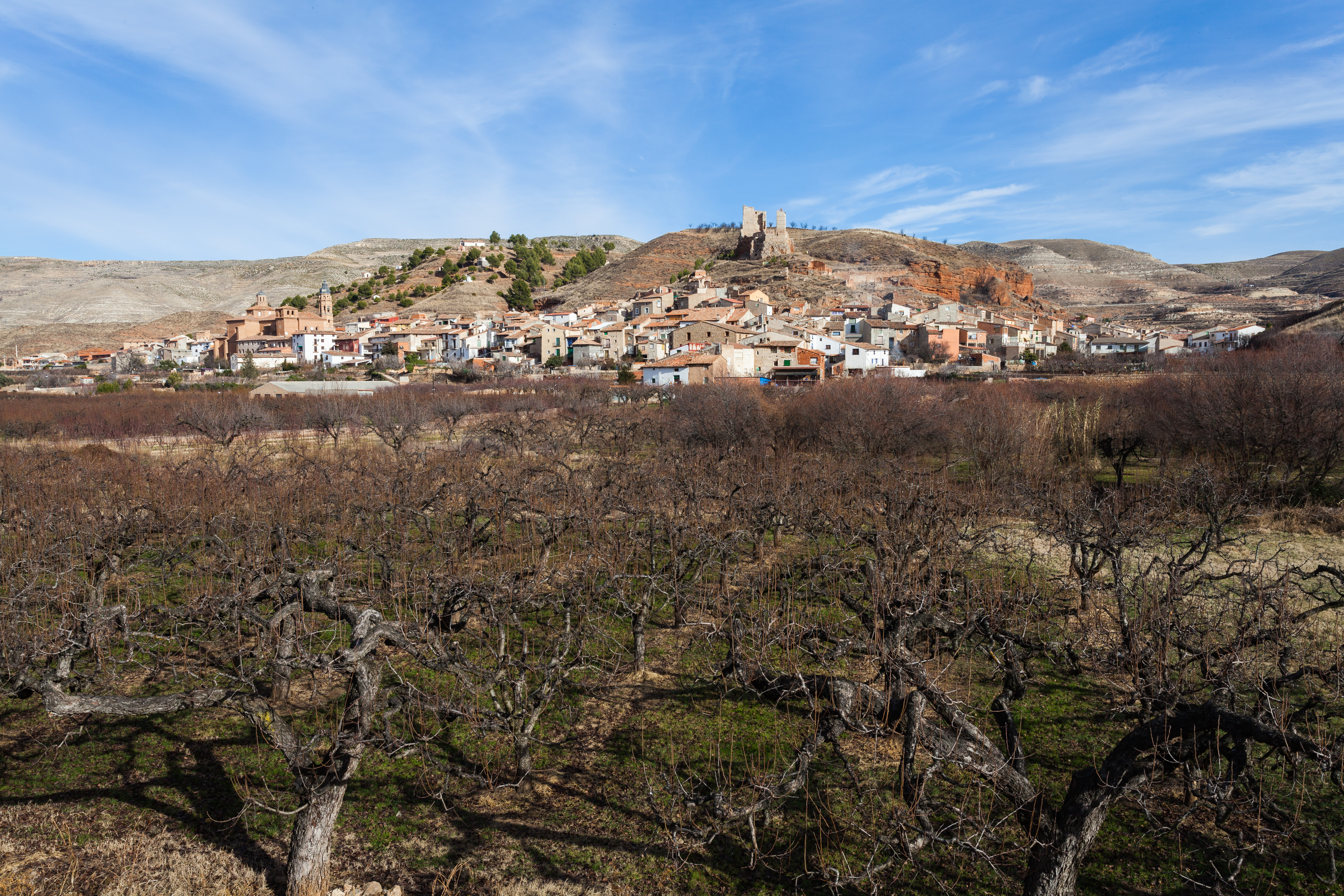
- Villafeliche
- Country: Spain
- Autonomous community: Aragon
- Province: Zaragoza

Area
  - Total: 22 km^{2} (8.5 sq mi)

Population (2025-01-01)
  - Total: 163
  - Density: 7.4/km^{2} (19/sq mi)
- Time zone: UTC+1 (CET)
  - Summer (DST): UTC+2 (CEST)

Villafeliche is a municipality located in the province of Zaragoza, Aragon, Spain. According to the 2004 census (INE), the municipality has a population of 226 inhabitants.

== Twin cities ==
- (Italy) Colfelice

== See also ==
- List of municipalities in Zaragoza
