= Segeda =

Coordinates: 41.3012°N 1.5174°W

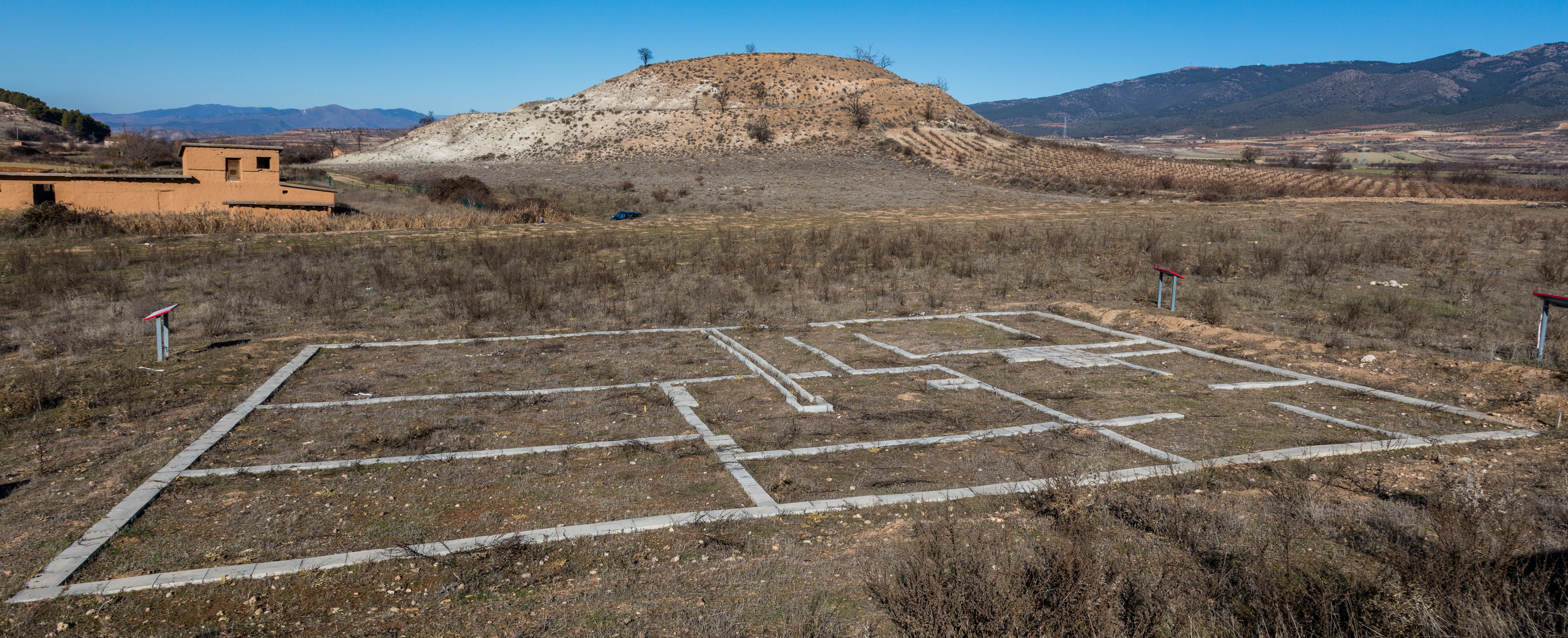

Segeda is an ancient settlement, between today's Belmonte de Gracián and Mara in the province of Zaragoza, Aragon, Spain. Originally it was a Celtiberian town, whose inhabitants, the Belli, gave it the name Sekeida or Sekeiza.

According to the Periochae, in 153 BC, the Roman Senate changed the first day of the consular year to 1 January in order to allow consul Quintus Fulvius Nobilior to attack the city of Segeda during the Celtiberian Wars. The city was destroyed during the war but, soon after, a new settlement was built on a nearby site. Coinage shows it had the same name as the old settlement, but "Segeda II" (as archeologists have named it) was under Roman influence, obvious from the rectilinear layout of streets and other features. During the events of the Roman Civil War, "Segeda II" was ruined, and after 49 BC it was abandoned permanently. In 1998 excavations began in the area, bringing this ancient settlement into prominence.
