= Godojos =

- municipality
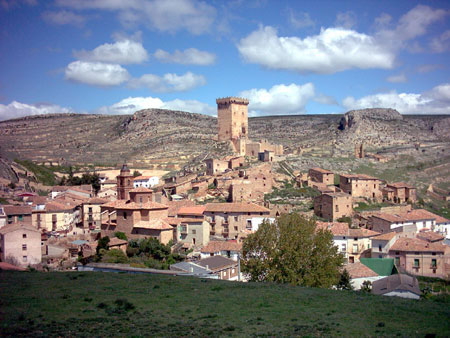
- Sierra de Solorio rising behind Godojos

- Location within Aragon Location within Spain Location within Europe
- Country: Spain
- Autonomous community: Aragon
- Province: Zaragoza

Area
  - Total: 16 km^{2} (6.2 sq mi)

Population (2025-01-01)
  - Total: 55
  - Density: 3.4/km^{2} (8.9/sq mi)
- Time zone: UTC+1 (CET)
  - Summer (DST): UTC+2 (CEST)

Godojos is a municipality located in the province of Zaragoza, Aragon, Spain. According to the 2004 census (INE), the municipality has a population of 60 inhabitants.

== See also ==
- List of municipalities in Zaragoza
