= Mesa (river) =

River in Spain

Mesa River (Río Mesa)
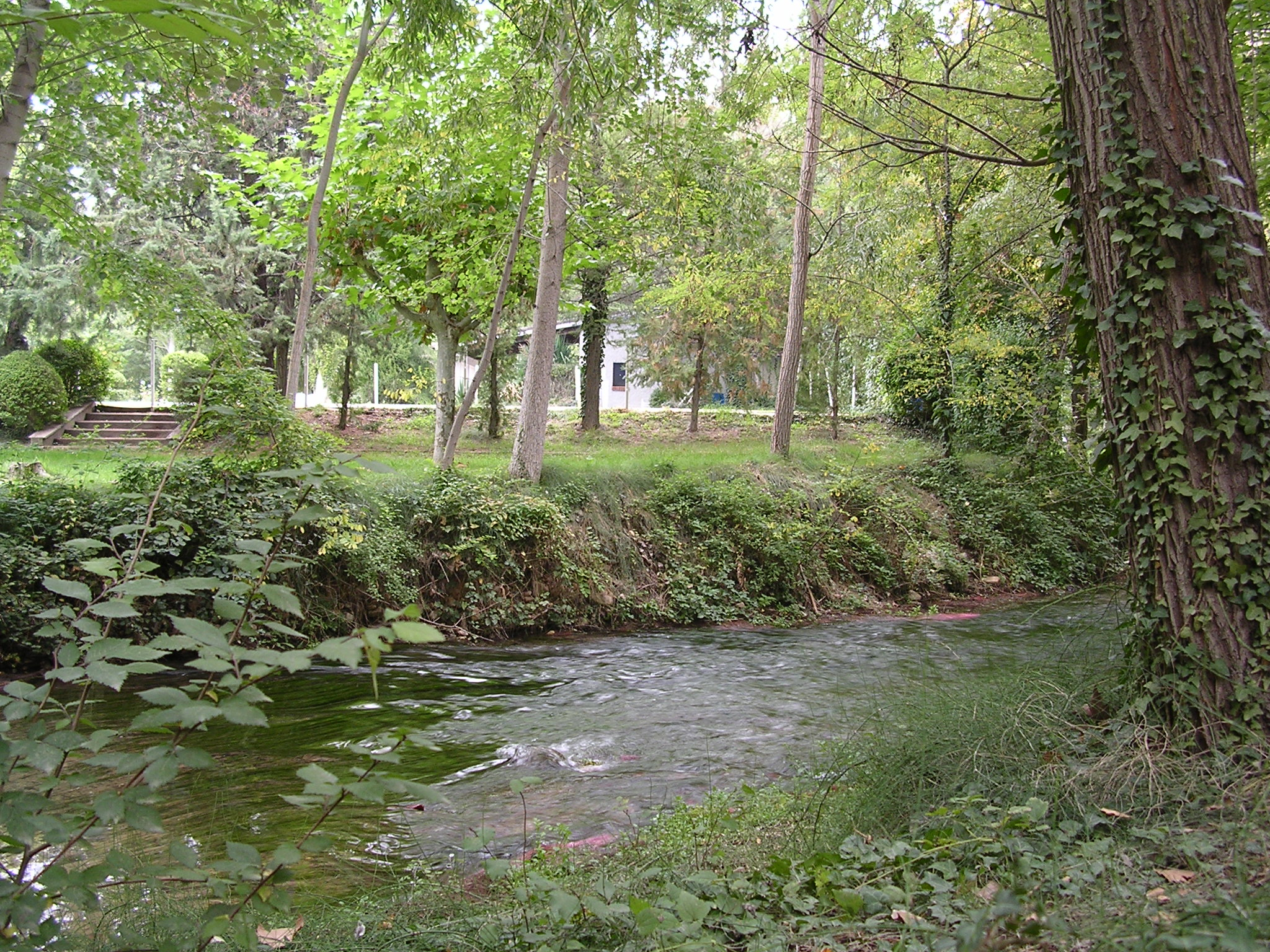
- View of the Mesa River in Jaraba

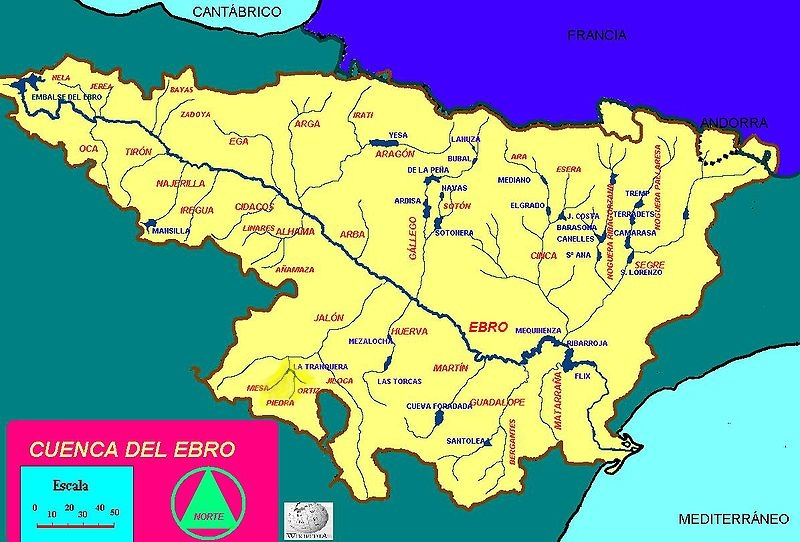
- The watershed of the Piedra within the Ebro basin

Location
- Country: Spain

Physical characteristics
- Source
  - location: Sierra de Solorio, Guadalajara Province; Castile-La Mancha
  - elevation: 1,272 m (4,173 ft)
- Mouth
  - location: Piedra River; La Tranquera Dam, Aragón
  - coordinates: 41°14′33″N 1°48′37″W
  - elevation: 691 m (2,267 ft)
- Length: 54.17 kilometres (33.66 mi)

Basin features
- Progression: Piedra - Jalón- Ebro - Mediterranean Sea
- River system: Ebro

The Mesa River (Spanish: Río Mesa) is a river in the Sierra de Solorio range area, Iberian System, Spain. It is a tributary of the Piedra River.

There are trout in the river, but the population of the endangered European freshwater crayfish in the river has practically disappeared owing to the introduction of the North American signal crayfish (Pacifastacus leniusculus).

== Geography ==
It rises near Selas, in the province of Guadalajara, Castile-La Mancha. The Mesa has an irregular flow, due to the long dry season of the summer months, with often heavy rainfall in the spring and autumn. It receives much water at Jaraba, where there are thermal springs.

The Mesa River cuts a deep canyon, locally known as Hoces del Río Mesa (Mesa River Gorges) or Valle del Mesa (Mesa Valley).

== See also ==
- List of rivers of Spain
