= Sierra de Solorio =

Mountain range

Solorio Range
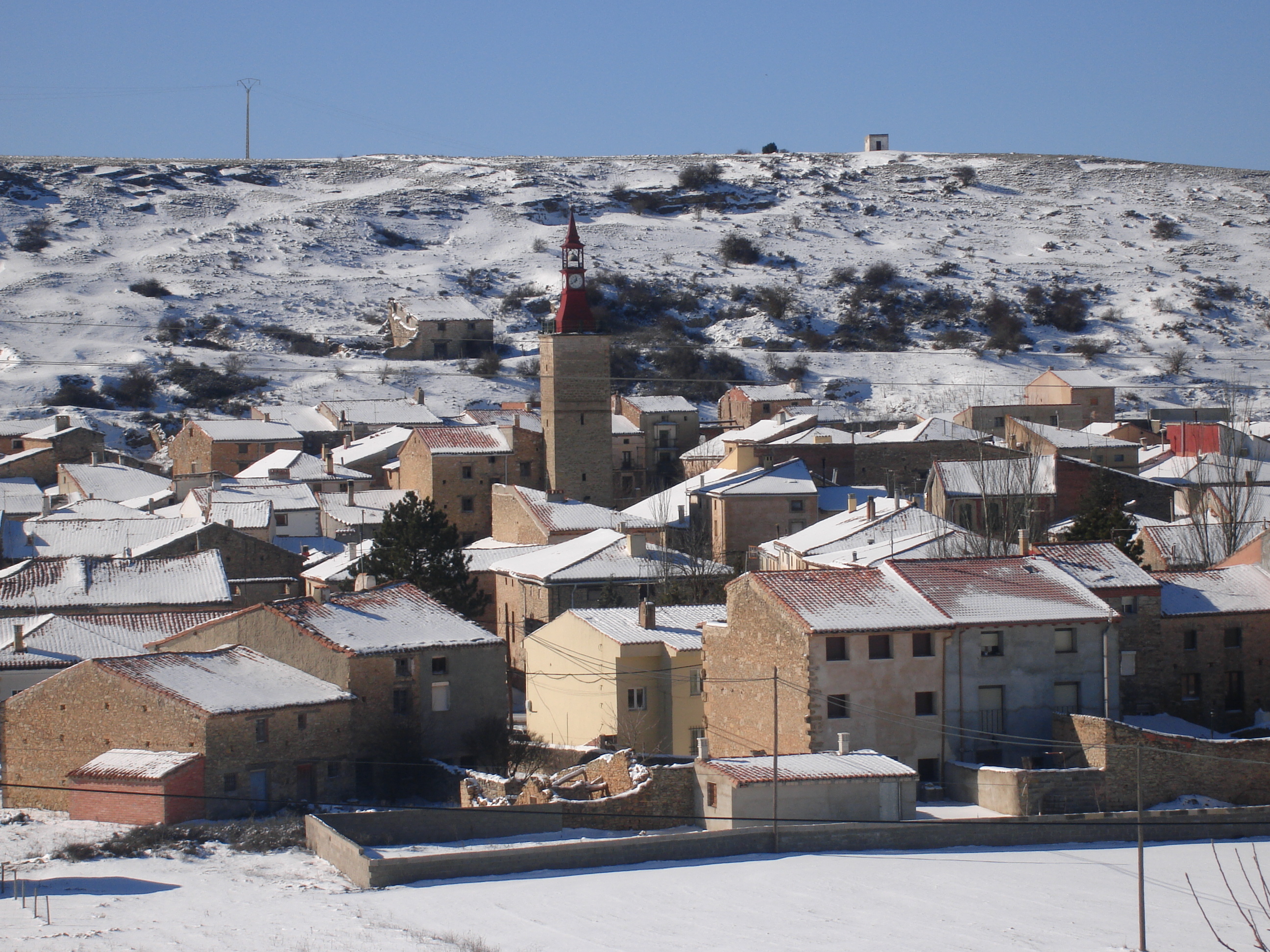
- Winter landscape of the range in Maranchón

Highest point
- Peak: Alto de San Sebastián
- Elevation: 1,366 m (4,482 ft)
- Coordinates: 41°05′N 2°11′W

Dimensions
- Length: 54 km (34 mi) ENE/WSW
- Width: 18 km (11 mi) NNW/SSE

Geography
- Location within Spain
- Location: Zaragoza, Aragon Soria, Castile and León Guadalajara, Castile-La Mancha
- Parent range: Iberian System, western zone

Geology
- Orogeny: Alpine orogeny
- Rock age: Mesozoic
- Rock type(s): Conglomerate, clay

Climbing
- Easiest route: From the towns of Maranchón or Luzón

The Solorio Range (Spanish: Sierra de Solorio) is a mountain range located in the western side of the Iberian System, Spain. It straddles Aragon, Castile-La Mancha and Castile and León.

== Description ==
The ridge is roughly aligned in an E-W direction. Its northern boundary is marked by the Jalón River and its southern by the Sierra de Selas and the Parameras de Molina; the eastern limits are at the Piedra River and the La Tranquera Dam, from where the ridge extends westwards until reaching Sierra Ministra.

There is very low population density in the area as villages are few and sparsely inhabited.

This mountain chain divides the Atlantic from the Mediterranean watershed, with rivers Tajuña, a tributary of the Tagus, and the Mesa River, a tributary of the Piedra which is part of the Ebro system, having their sources in this range. In the Sierra de Solorio there is the largest Spanish Juniper forest in Europe. The Common Juniper is also found in the range.

=== Summits ===
None of the Sierra de Solorio summits are very conspicuous, for their prominence rarely surpasses 300 m. Its highest point is Alto de San Sebastián (1,366 m). Other notable summits are Veracruz (1.355 m.) located south of Luzón, Las Papas (1.351 m.) between Judes and Maranchón, Alto de la Calera (1.308 m.) between Iruecha and Codes, Alto de Judes (1.293 m.) east of Judes, Sima de Calmarza (1.039 m.) east of Calmarza, Cabeza del Águila (1.022 m.) north of Calmarza and Loma del Camarero (949 m.) north of Jaraba. There is a mountain pass at Maranchón.

== Features ==
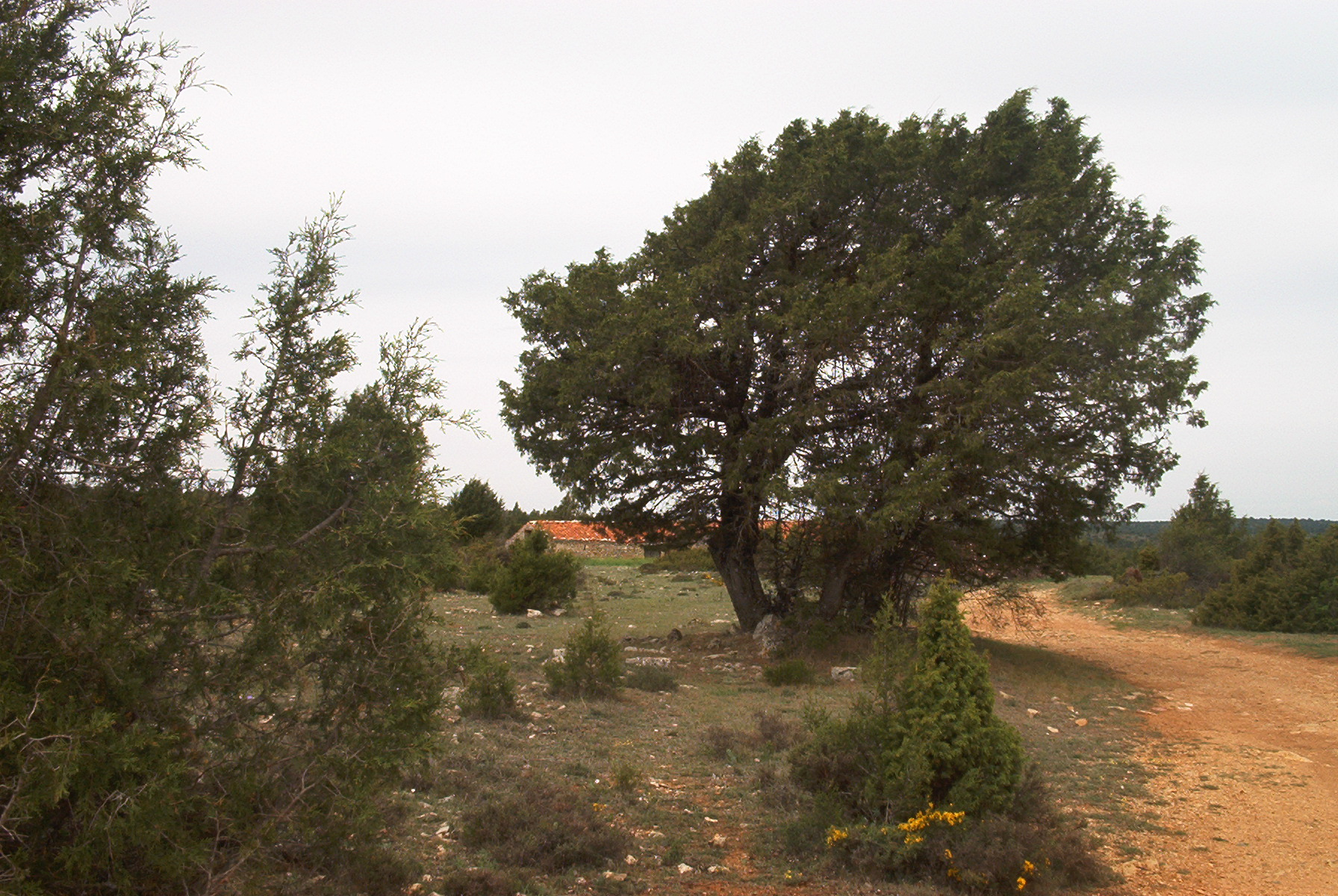
Spanish Juniper trees in the range

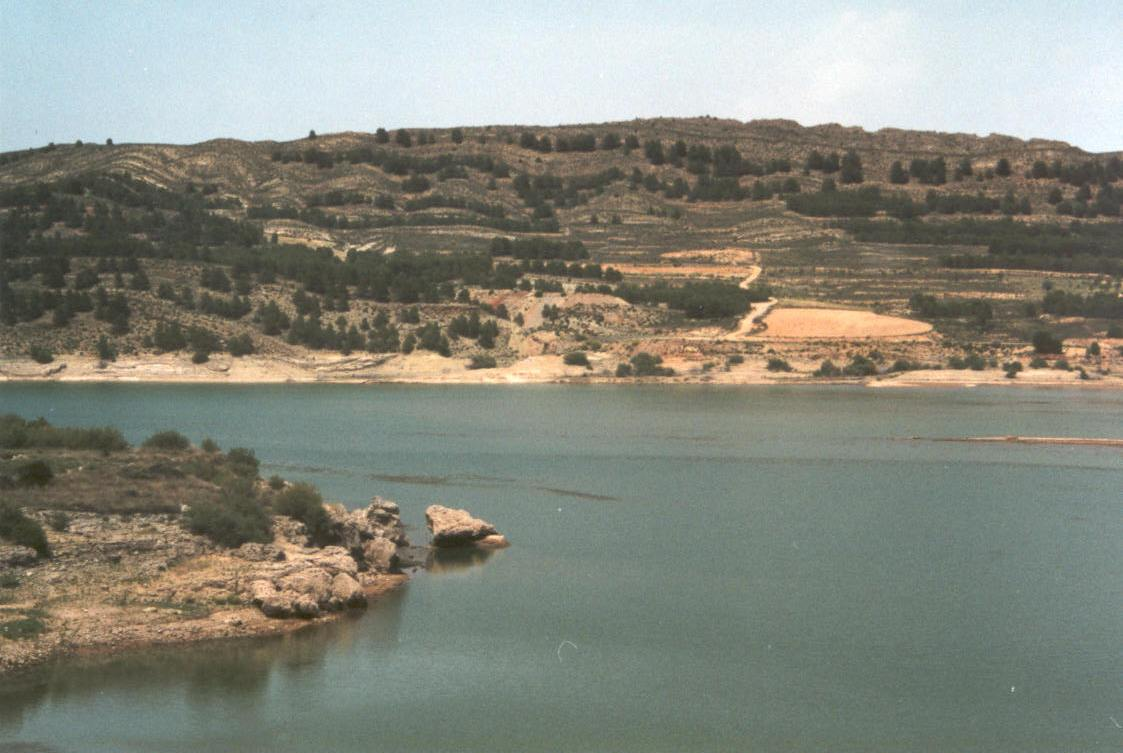
View of the eastern end of the range at La Tranquera Dam

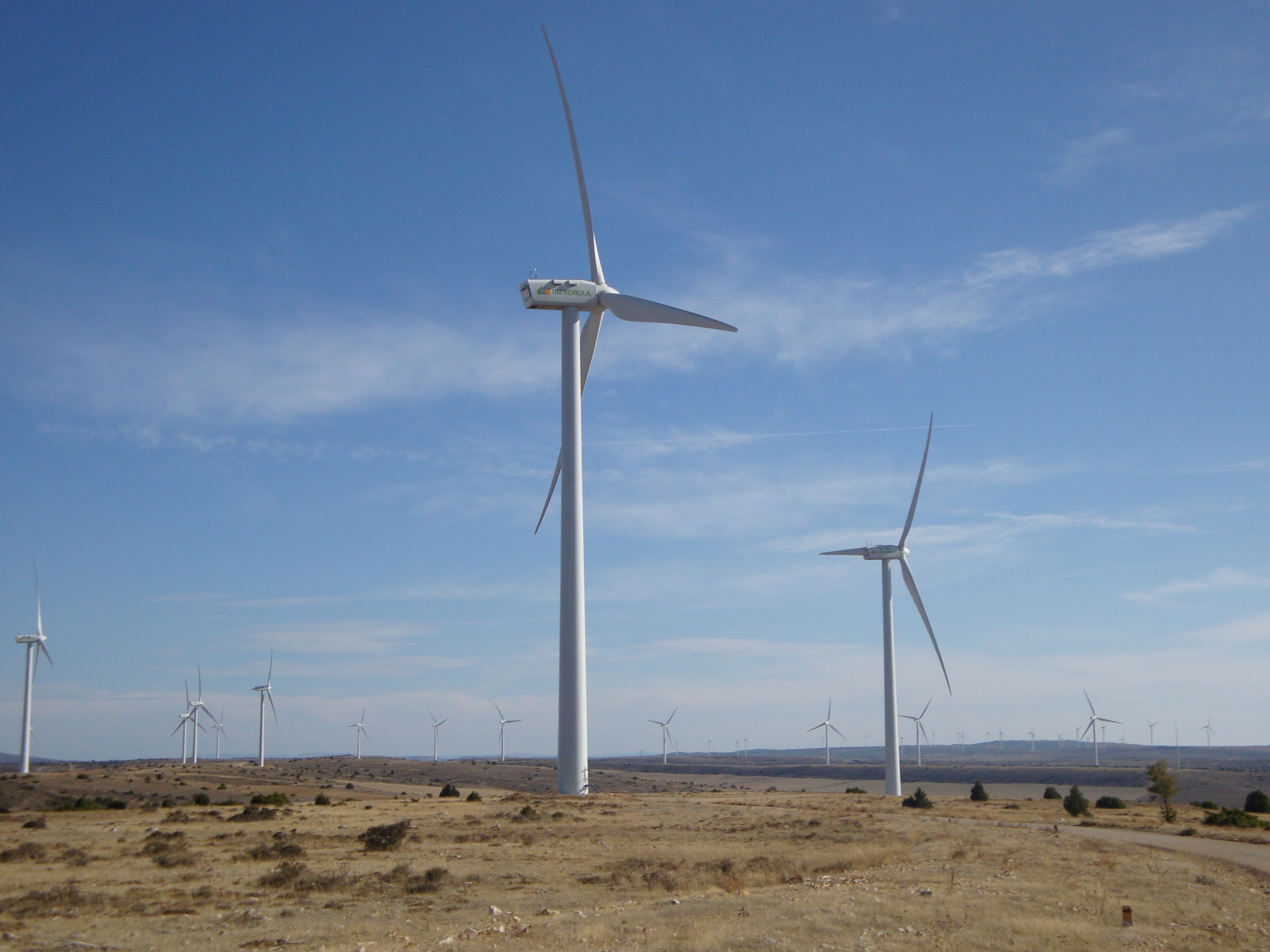
Wind farm on top of the ridge near Maranchón

== See also ==
- Iberian System
- Mountains of Aragon
