= Castle of Alcocer =

- Castillo de Alcocer (Spanish)
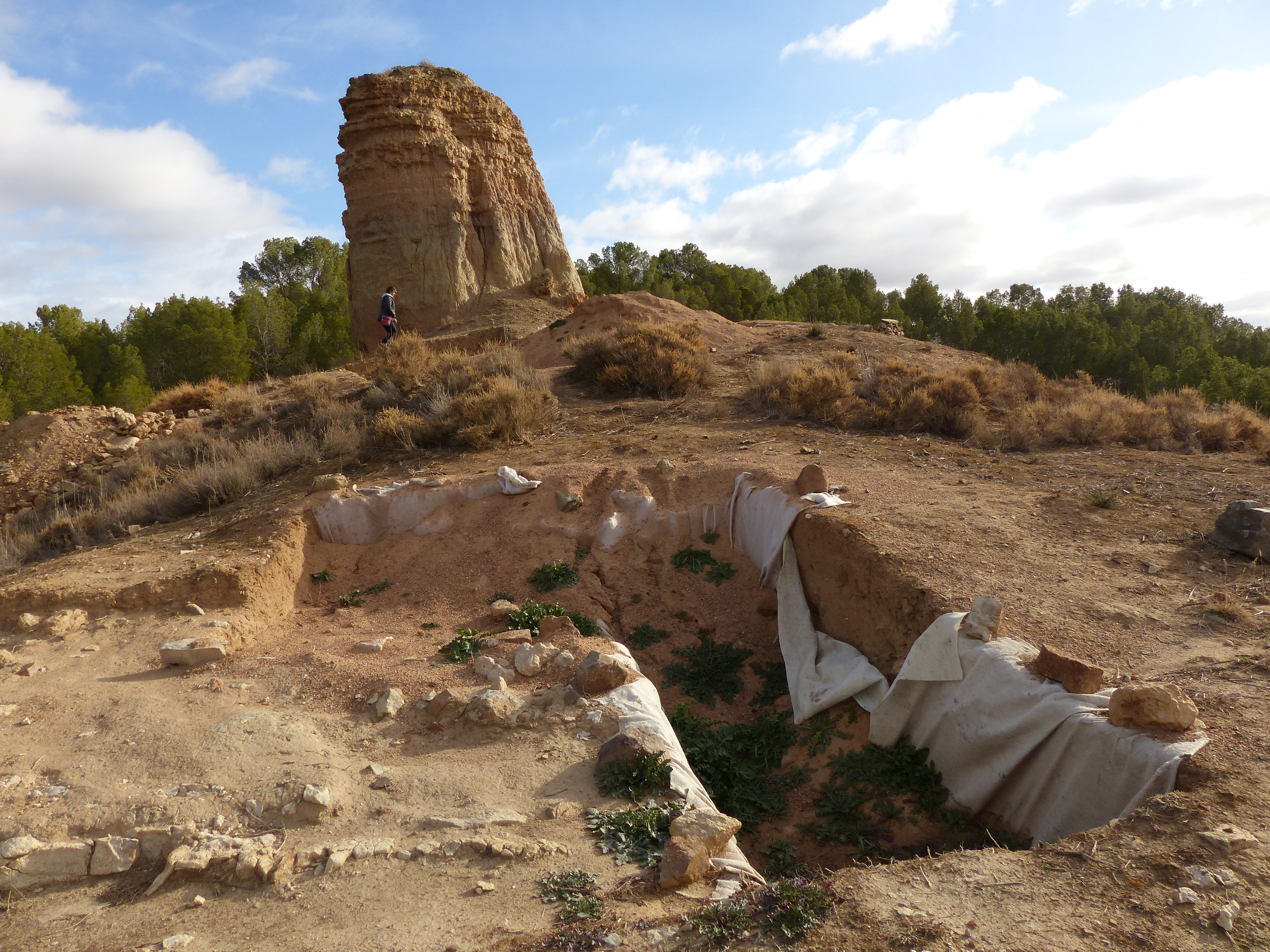
- Excavation work of the Castle of Alcocer

- Location within Spain
- Location: Ateca, Spain

Spanish Cultural Heritage
- Type: Non-movable
- Criteria: archaeological site
- Reference no.: 1-INM-ZAR-020-038-013

The castle of Alcocer was a fortified Muslim village located in the archaeological site of La Mora Encantada in the Aragonese municipality of Ateca, Zaragoza, Spain.

== History ==
Located on the left bank of the river Jalón as well as Ateca and Terrer, this is one of the most important castles in the development of Cantar de Mio Cid. The facts that are narrated in the Cantar, are placed in the year 1081 during the campaigns realized by El Cid during his exile. Although these facts had not been documented reliable and believed to be the exclusive fruit of the literary source of the Cantar de Mio Cid, recent archaeological discoveries, linked to the narrated in the singing, above all, referring to the campaigns in the Jalón Valley, are beginning to rethink whether what is narrated in the singing is fiction or has a histologic origin.

The name of Alcocer comes from the Arabic al-Quṣayr (القصير), meaning "the palazuelo", Arabic diminutive of al-qaṣr (القصر), "alcázar" or "the palace".

In the Cantar de Mio Cid, these verses appear:

Otro dia movios mio Çid el de Bivar
e passo a Alfama, la Foz ayuso va,
passo a Bovierca e a Teca que es adelant
e sobre Alcoçer mio Çid iva posar
en un otero redondo fuerte e grand;
açerca corre Salon, agua nol puedent vedar.
Mio Çid don Rodrigo Alcoçer cueda ganar.

This verse proves that the Alcocer quoted in the Song does not refer in any case to the Alcocer of Guadalajara. In front of these remains, crossing the river Jalon, on top of a hill, is the camp that occupied the Cid in the otero to which the Song refers is what is now called Otero del Cid or Cerro de Torrecid.

== Description ==
The most striking remaining is a large cliff, which are the remains of a massive tower of rammed earth that should have measured about 10 by 16 meters of base and is very worn. at its feet the foundations of existing buildings have been discovered in recent excavations and plans have been built. There are walls about 40 cm high and it seems that it was not a castle in itself but a "fonda" or fortified village.

== Legal protection ==
The castle of Alcocer is inscribed in the Aragonese Registry of Assets of Cultural Interest being included within the relation of castles considered Cultural interest, in the section of archaeological site, under the provisions of the second additional provision of Law 3/1999, dated March 10, of the Aragonese Cultural Heritage. This list was published in the Official Bulletin of Aragon on May 22, 2006.

== Sources ==
- The information in this article is based on that in its Spanish equivalent.
- Patrimonio cultural de Aragón
- Excavaciones 2017
