= Torrecid =

- Castillo de Torrecid (Spanish)
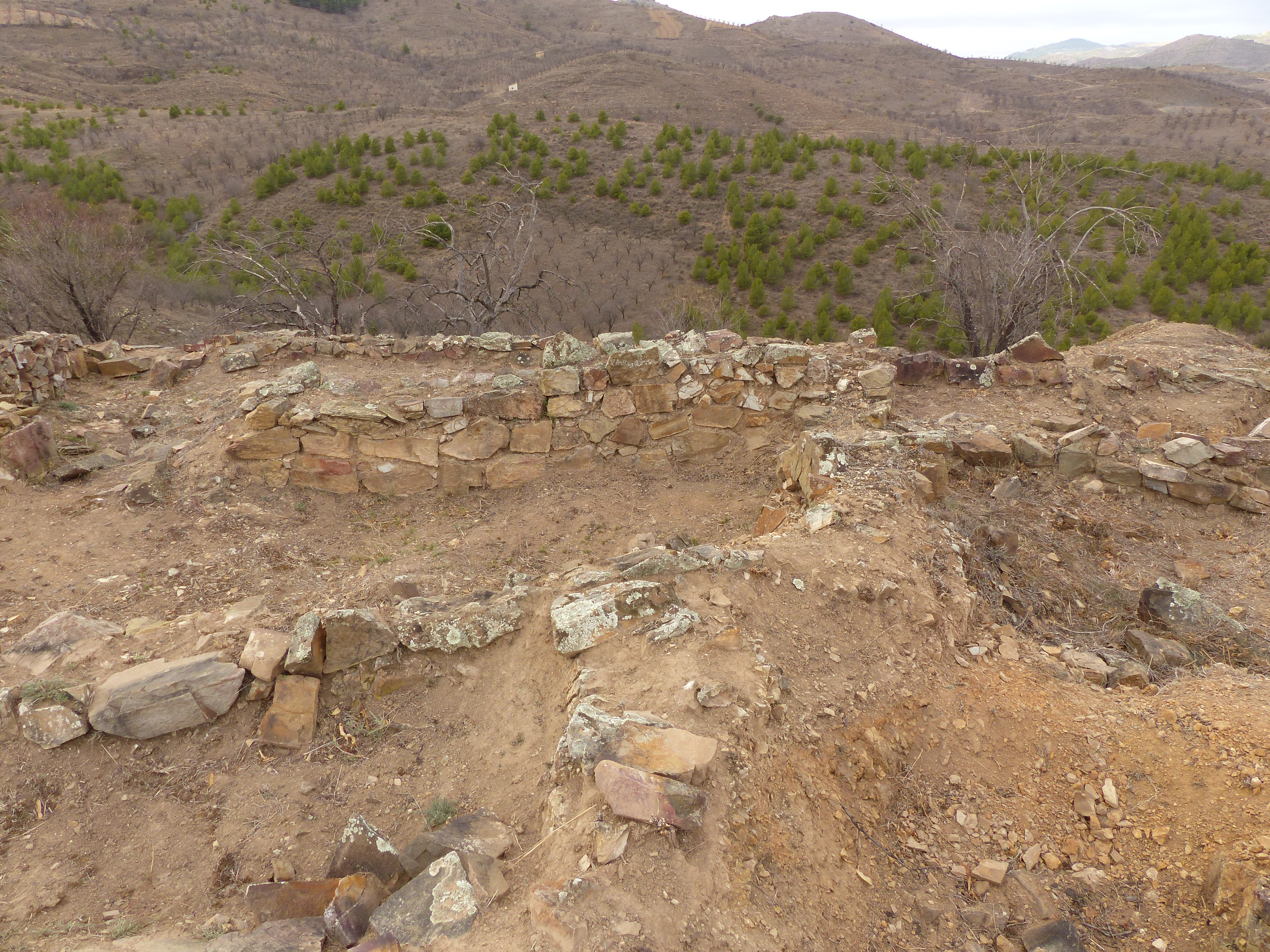
- Remains of settlements in Torrecid

- Location within Spain
- Location: Ateca, Spain

Spanish Cultural Heritage
- Type: Non-movable
- Criteria: archaeological site

Torrecid was a Christian motte-and-bailey castle where El Cid camped for fifteen weeks around the year 1081 according to legend. The site remained buried for almost a thousand years until recent archaeological excavations found it where Cantar de Mio Cid describes it. The site, located in the valley of the Jalón river, is in the current municipality of Ateca (Zaragoza), Spain. To date the regional Government of Aragon has not cataloged it so its protection is the generic indicated in the Decree of 22 April 1949 and Law 16/1985 of protection of the Spanish Historical Heritage.

== History ==
Located on the right bank of the Jalón river, it is one of the most important castles in the development of the epic Cantar de Mio Cid. It is located in the area, now called Torrecil, in front of the so-called La Mora Encantada, where the castle of Alcocer was located, separated from it by the channel of the Jalón river and about two thousand meters away. The facts described in the song are situated around the year 1081.

The hill where El Cid camped for fifteen weeks according to the lay, is the place called Cerro Torrecid or Otero del Cid where the ruins that occupy us are located and it is a temporary fortified camp (mota), rather than a castle proper, next to the one that would settle the tents that the Cid would take because according to the lay they were accompanied by three hundred knights and three hundred pawns that obviously had no place inside this small fortification. From here they could watch Alcocer separated only by the river Jalón.

== Modern times ==
There is scarcely any remains of the fortification that was built in a short time by the men of El Cid, but only a few walls of masonry, covered with mud, barely half a meter high, which makes it possible to see the layout of the small fortified enclosure, it had a watchtower of about ten meters of height, placing the tents of the camp around the recito. It has been possible to construct plans of seven rooms and numerous remains of ceramics of the eleventh century have been found. The highlight of these remains is that if we stand on them we can easily see in front of them the remains of the Alcocer, to the right we see the town of Terrer and left the town of Ateca who at that time paid pariahs.

== Legal protection ==
It is protected within the generic declaration of Cultural interest of all the castles of Spain by the Decree of 22 of April 1949 and Law 16/1985 of protection of the Spanish Historical Heritage.

== Bibliography ==
- The information in this article is based on that in its Spanish equivalent.
