= Ateca =

Ateca, Spain
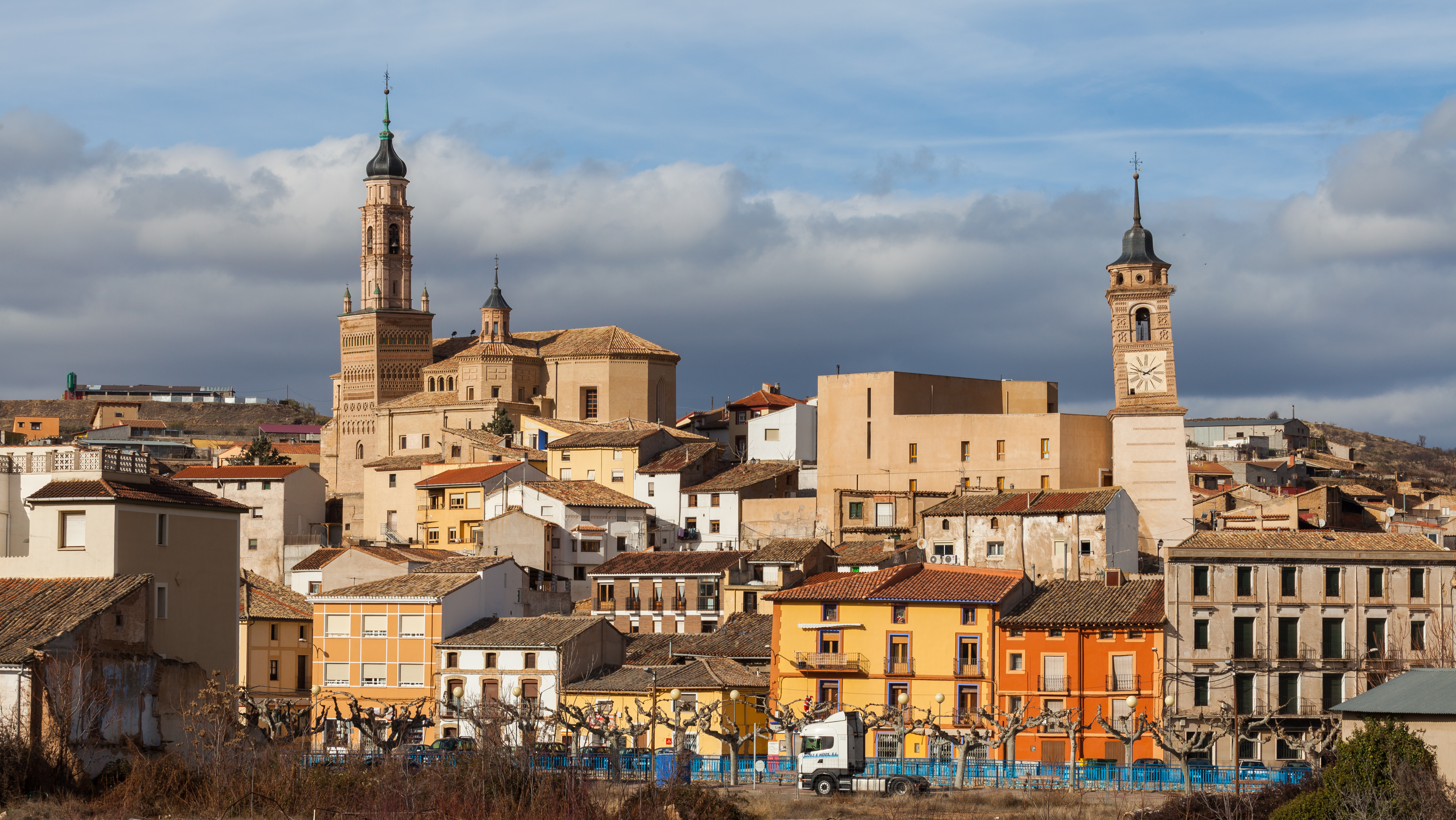

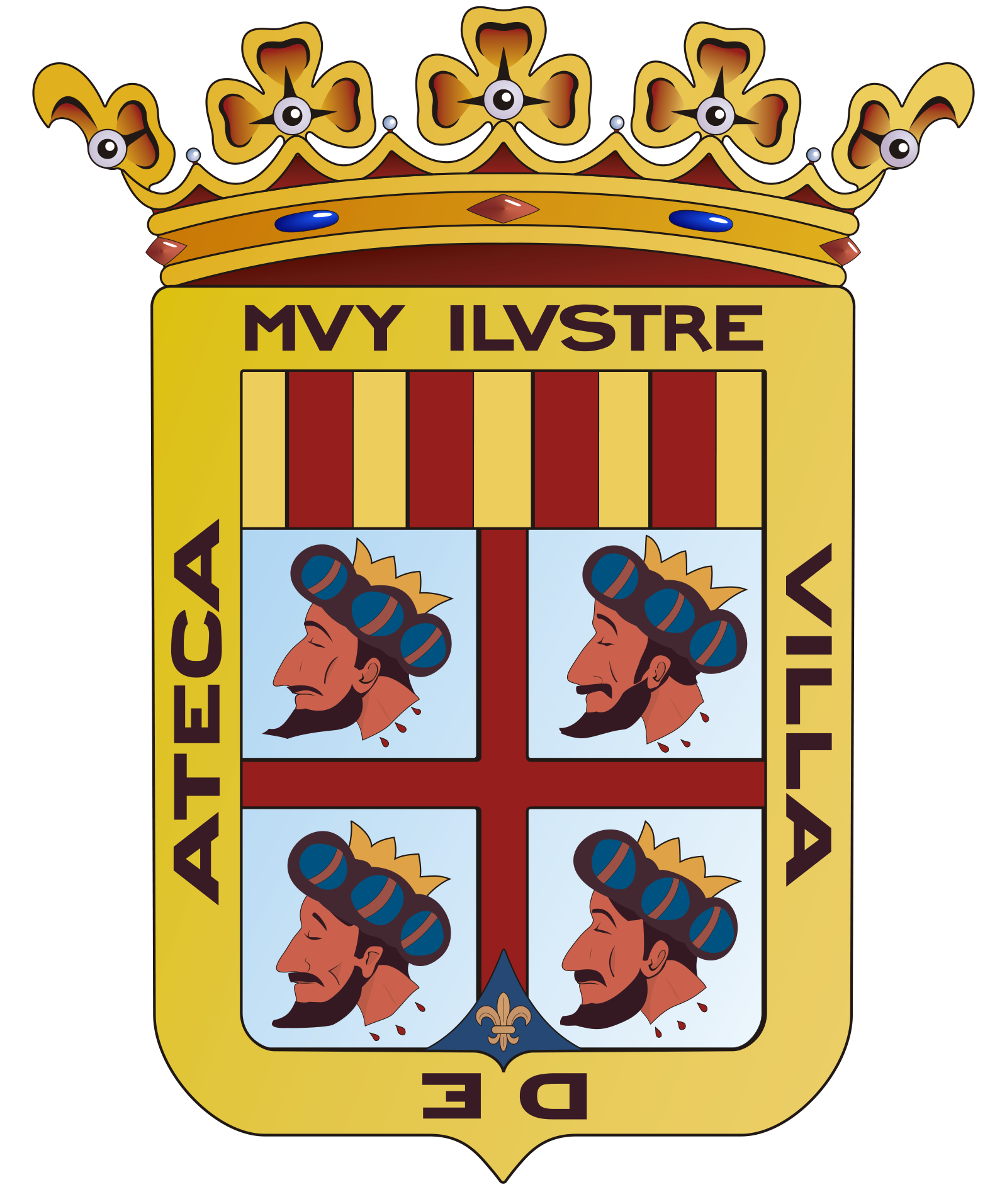
- Flag Coat of arms

- Location within Aragon Location within Spain Location within Europe
- Country: Spain
- Autonomous community: Aragon
- Province: Zaragoza
- Municipality: Ateca

Area
  - Total: 84 km^{2} (32 sq mi)

Population (2025-01-01)
  - Total: 1,785
  - Density: 21/km^{2} (55/sq mi)
- Time zone: UTC+1 (CET)
  - Summer (DST): UTC+2 (CEST)
- Website: http://www.aytoateca.es/

Ateca is a municipality located in the province of Zaragoza, Aragon, Spain. At the time of the 2015 census (INE), the municipality had a population of 1,969.

The River Jalón is joined by the River Piedra and the River Manubles at Ateca.

The town was home to a Cadbury factory, until it closed down in 2013.

Ateca is twinned with Lézat-sur-Lèze in France. The Seat Ateca SUV takes its name from this area.

== Location ==
Ateca is found in the central Iberian System, southwest of the province at the confluence of the Jalón and Manubles rivers. It is located to 100 km of Zaragoza, 220 to Madrid and 15 to the southwest of Calatayud.

Its concrete location - at 647 masl - is the left bank of the Jalon River, just inside the confluence with the Manubles.

In addition to these two rivers, the Monegrillo waters its municipal term.

== Climate ==
Its average temperature throughout the year is 13.5 °C and has an annual rainfall of 380 mm.

== Place names ==
During the Muslim rule of the peninsula the conquerors renamed it with the name from the Arabic عتيقة `Atīqa, which means "ancient". which can give idea of the remote at the time of this settlement.

== Demography ==
Since 1860, when Ateca had a population of 3786 inhabitants, the population of the municipality has been gradually decreasing. Emigration has been accentuated since 1950, leading to an aging population, which, if it was 25 years old on average in 1860, in 1970 it exceeded 36; in this last year, 18% of the population had more than sixty years. However, emigration has slowed in the 21st century. In 2016, Ateca had 1856 inhabitants.

== Economy ==
The commercial and services function is diminished by the proximity of Calatayud, and with the passage of time its area of influence has been losing entity. In the nineteenth century the town counted on stores of cloths, quincalla, canvases and fabrics; in 1842 he was awarded an annual fair. Historically Ateca has always been an important center of pottery, with its peculiar characteristics that distinguished it from the rest of the zone.

At present, the main industrial activity is the manufacture of chocolate. There are two factories: Valor Chocolates, Ancient Chocolates Hueso, and Atienza Chocolates, a smaller family business. The first, founded in 1862, has a national network for the distribution of Huesitos chocolate bars. On 16 July 2013, Mondelēz announced the sale of the factory, along with the Huesito and Tokke brands, to the Spanish company Chocolates Valor, thus avoiding the relocation of the factory planned by the North American company. In addition, in the municipality there is a wood industry, a furniture factory (Sémper Furniture) and a new call center of the GSS Group with more than one hundred posts.

Agriculture continues to play an important role in Ateca, since the Vega del Jalon is one of the main fruit-growing areas of the peninsula. We must highlight the production of apples, cherries of excellent quality and almonds, as well as grapes of the different varieties that can be produced in the area according to the regulatory board. The Cooperativa Virgen de la Peana field produces wines within the Denominación de Origen Calatayud (DO), mainly obtained from the variety of Grenache grape of the zone.

== Services ==
The locality counts on municipal swimming pool, fronton and San Blas soccer field of artificial grass where its quarrel the C.D. Ateca who plays for Primera Regional Aragón.

There are several educational centers; The EEI La Solana, the CEIP Virgen de la Peana and the IES Zaurín, which cover the teaching needs of the municipality of nearby villages.

It also has community health center, community pharmacy, public library, clean point, Guardia Civil police station, multi-purpose pavilion.

== Main sights ==
- The town is a place of passage of the Camino del Cid
- Castle of Alcocer
- Torrecid
- Castle of Ateca
- Town Hall
- Church of Santa María (Ateca)
- Church of San Francisco (Ateca)
- Clock Tower of Ateca

== See also ==
- SEAT Ateca, a car named after the town
- List of municipalities in Zaragoza

== Gallery ==
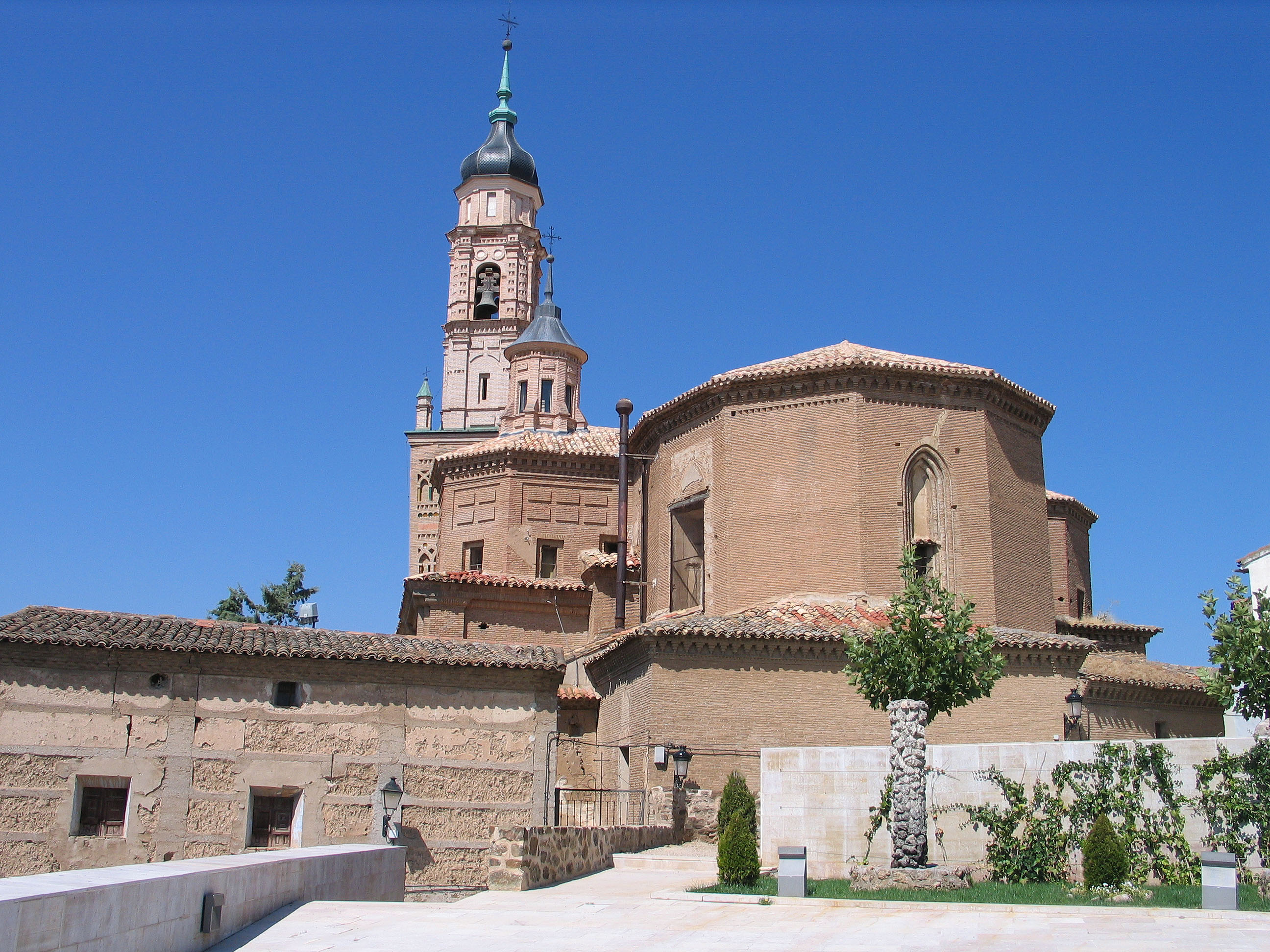
Church of Santa María

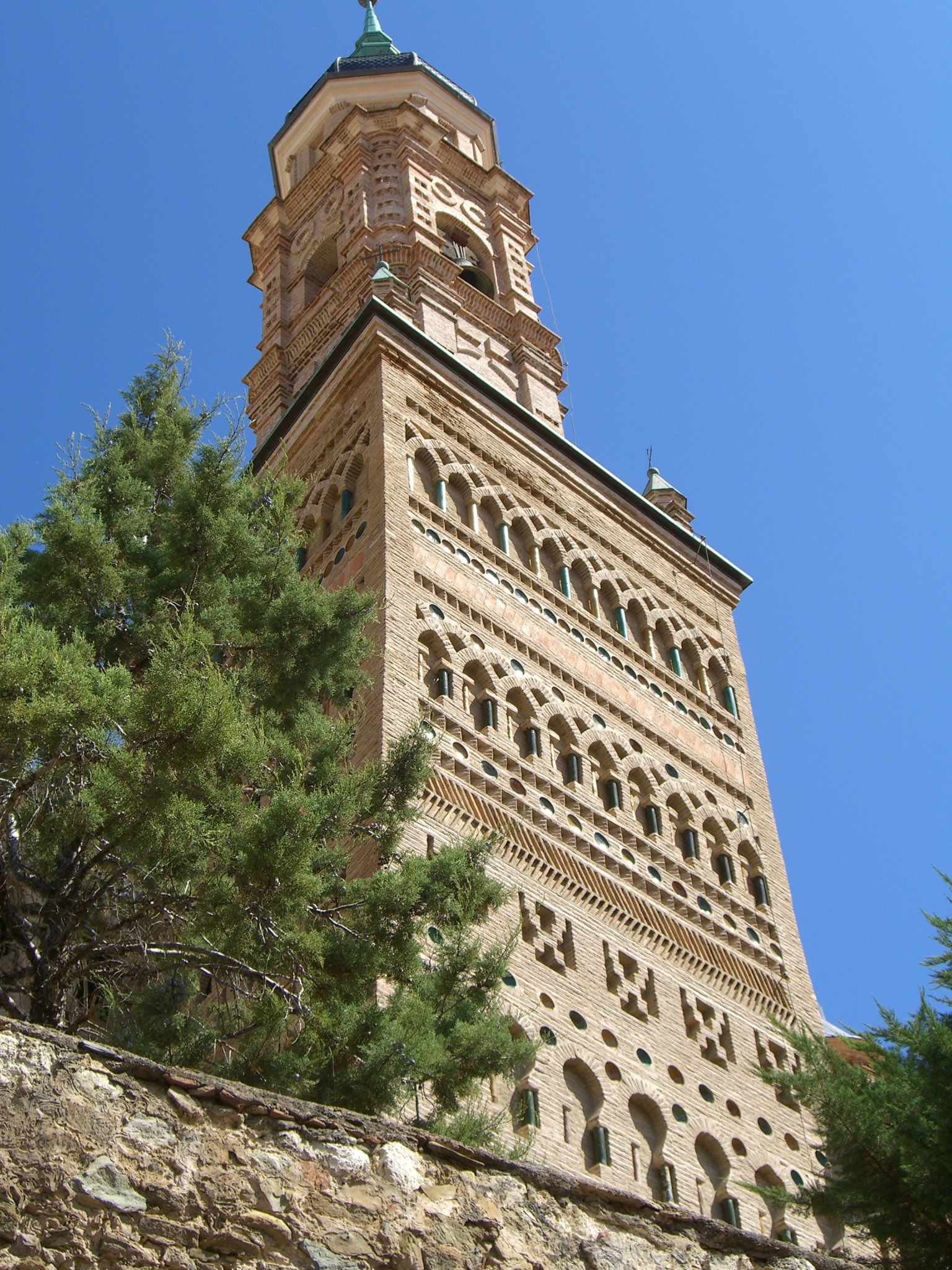
Tower of the church

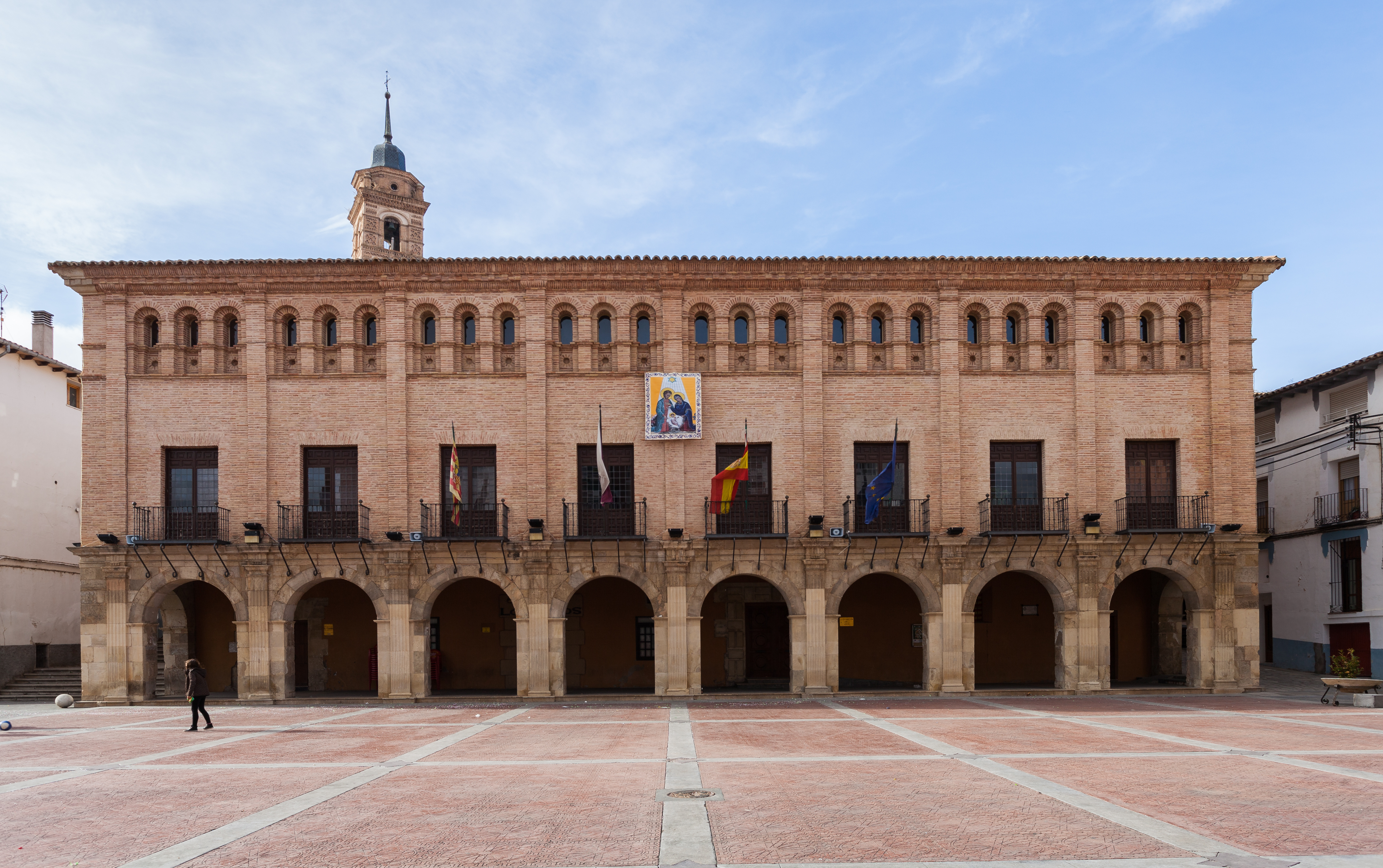
Town Hall

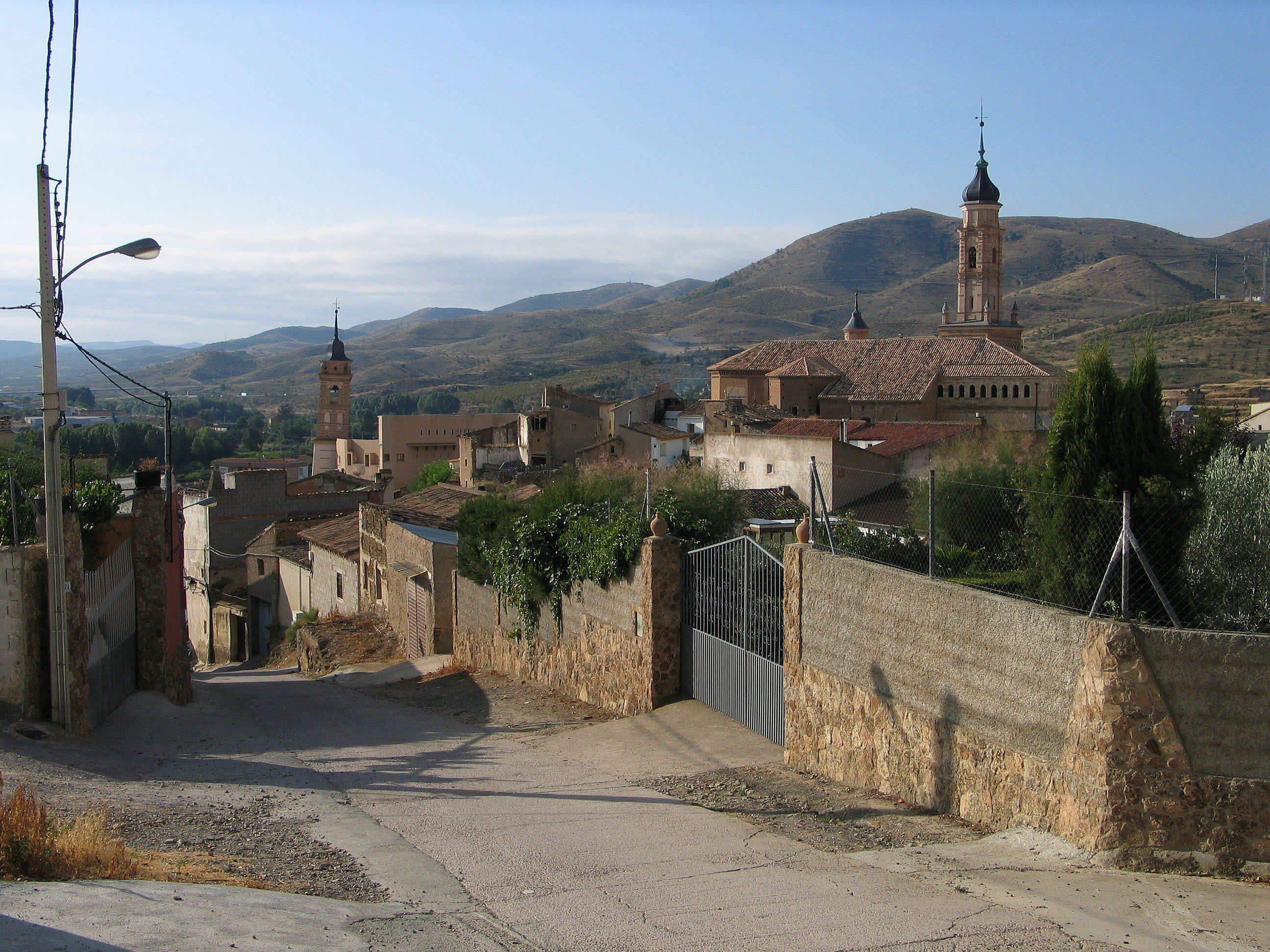
Ateca 2008

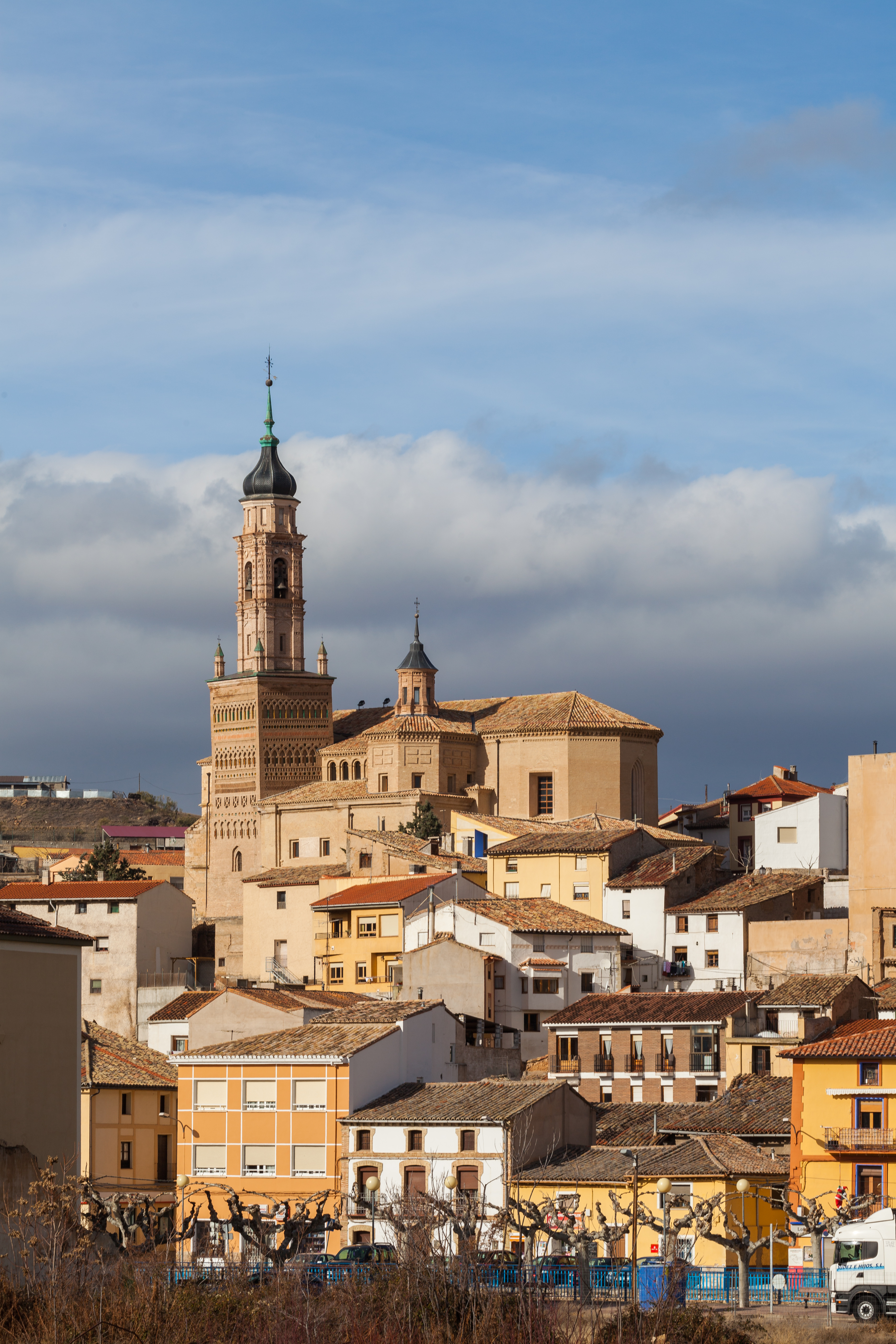
view of the town in 2013

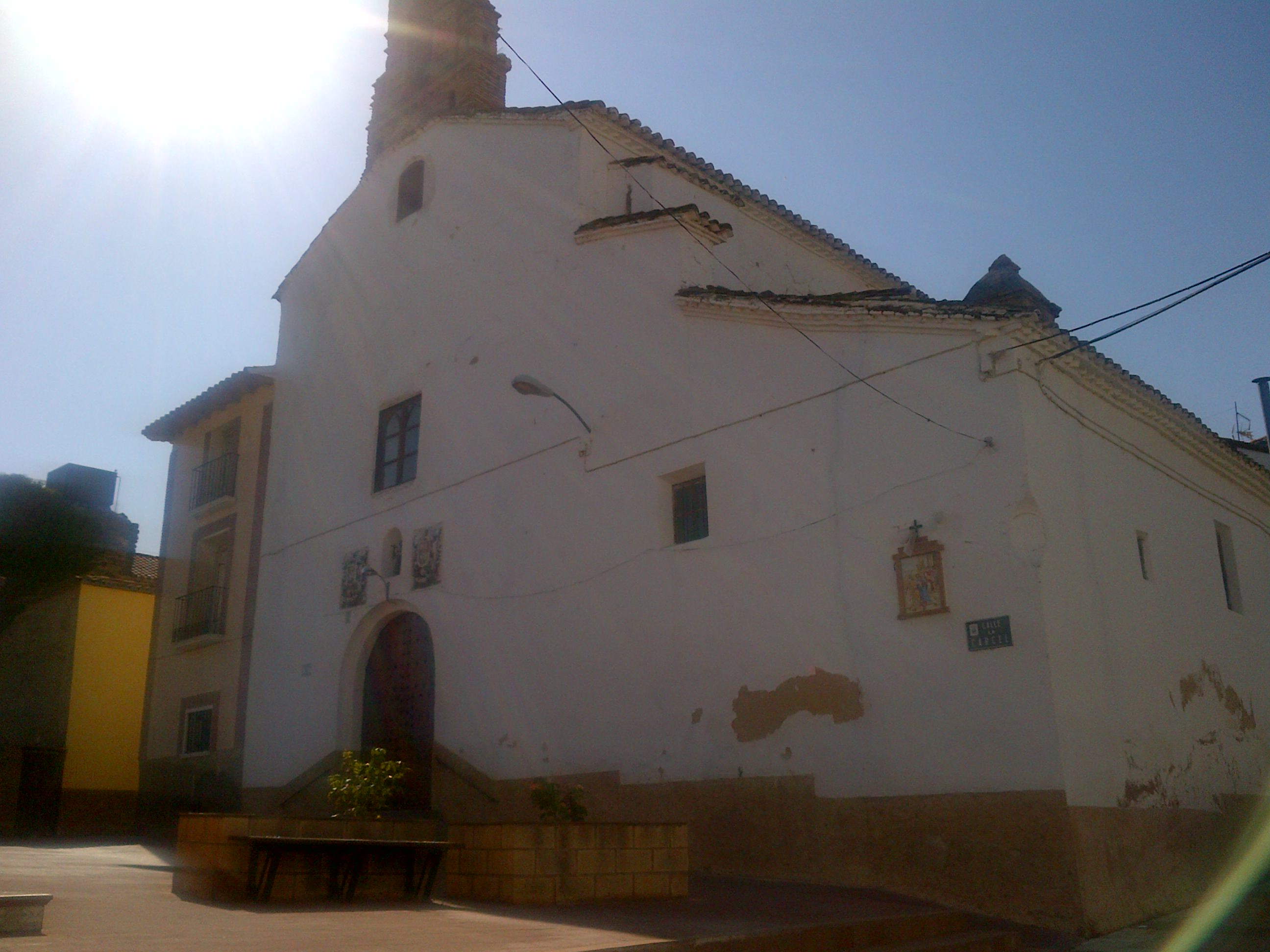
Church of San Francisco

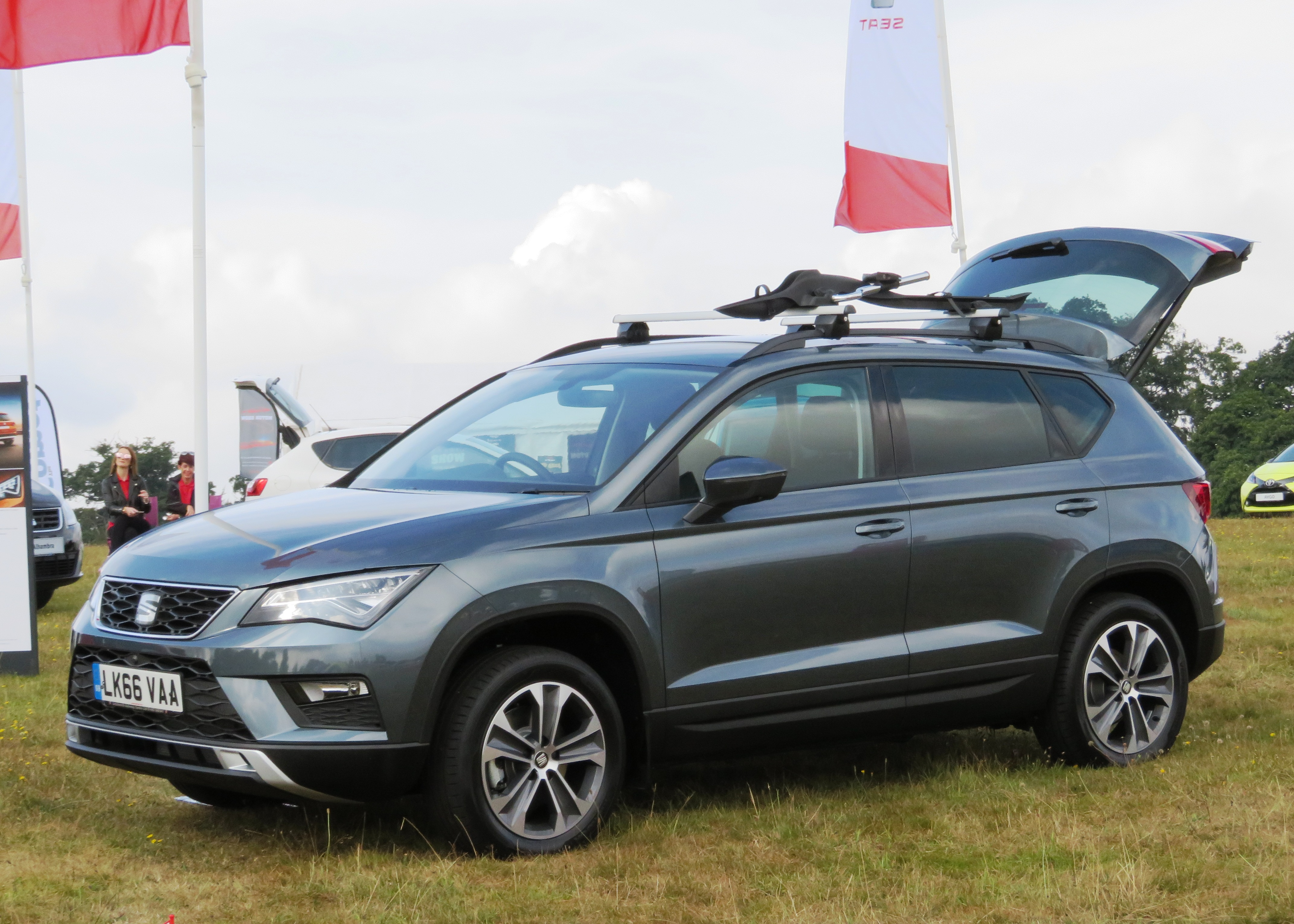
SEAT Ateca

== Sources ==
- The information in this article is based on that in its Spanish equivalent.
