= Torres de Berrellén =

Torres de Berrellén, Spain
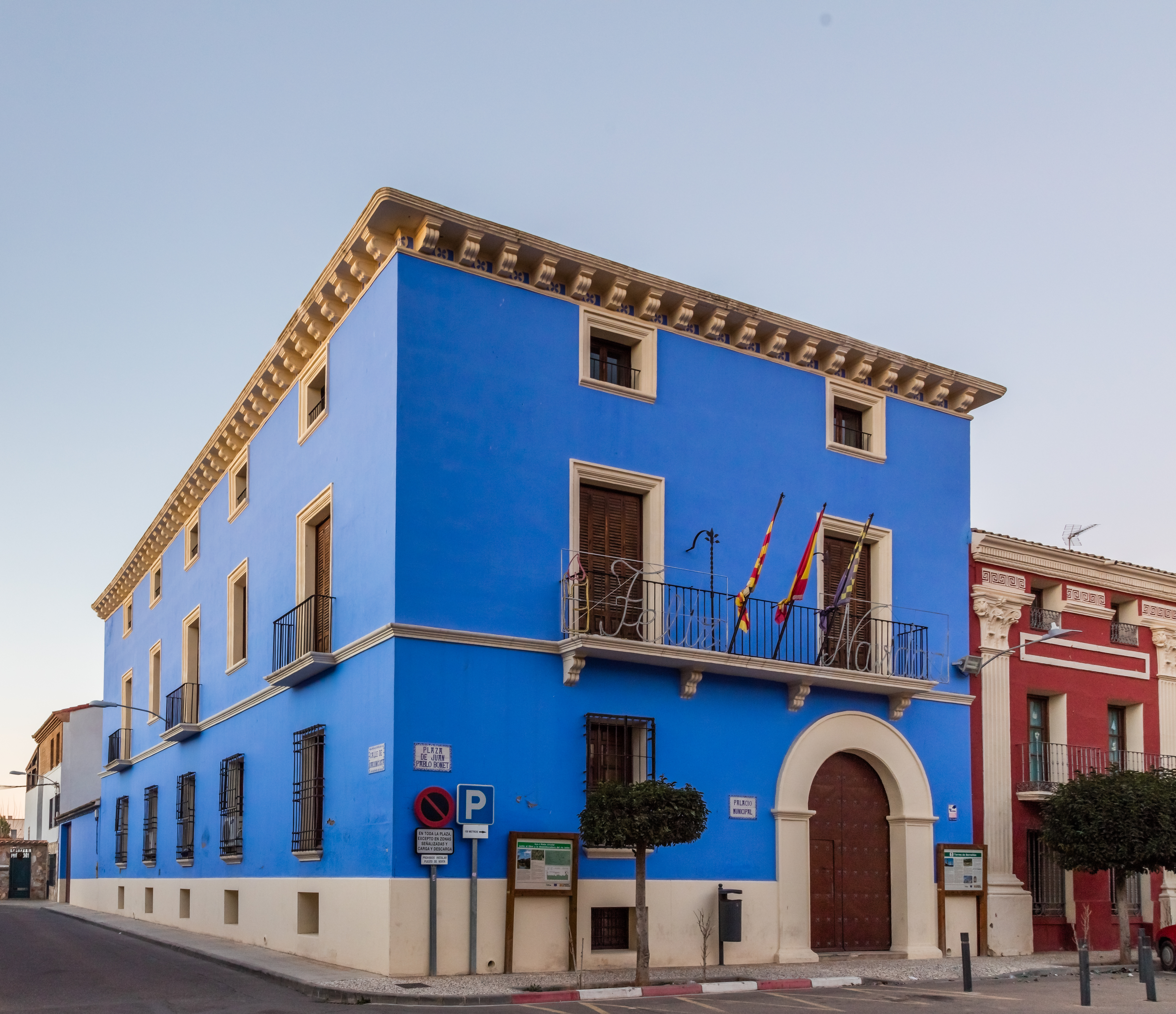
- Town hall

- Flag Coat of arms

- Location within Spain
- Coordinates: 41°45′N 1°04′W
- Country: Spain
- Autonomous community: Aragon
- Province: Zaragoza
- Municipality: Torres de Berrellén

Area
  - Total: 54 km^{2} (21 sq mi)

Population (2025-01-01)
  - Total: 1,515
  - Density: 28/km^{2} (73/sq mi)
- Time zone: UTC+1 (CET)
  - Summer (DST): UTC+2 (CEST)

Torres de Berrellén is a municipality located in the province of Zaragoza, Aragon, Spain. According to the 2004 census (INE), the municipality has a population of 1450 inhabitants. Its population density is 28,08 inhabitants per square kilometre (70/sq mi).

== Geography ==
Torres de Berellén is located by where the river Jalón becomes a tributary of the main Ebro river. The town belongs to the province of Zaragoza, and it borders Tauste and Pradilla de Ebro north; Remolinos, Alcalá de Ebro and Cabañas de Ebro west; Alagón and La Joyosa south and Sobradiel and Zaragoza east.

== Politics ==
=== Election results ===
Party	2003	2007	2011	2015
PSOE	4	4	5	5
PP	3	2	3	2
IU	1	2	1	2
PAR	1	1	-	-
CHA	-	-	-	-
Total	9	9	9	9

== Demography ==
=== Demographic evolution of Torres de Berrellén ===
1910	1920	1930	1940	1950	1960	1970	1981	1991	1996	2001	2006	2009
1301	1595	1734	1573	1703	1768	1625	1491	1438	1402	1418	1449	1523

== History ==
The town's name has its origins in a local word for agriculture houses (torres), which started to being built in this place in the 12th century by people from El Castellar.

== Twin cities ==
- Escalquens, France

== See also ==
- List of municipalities in Zaragoza
