= Clock Tower of Ateca =

- Torre del Reloj de Ateca (Spanish)
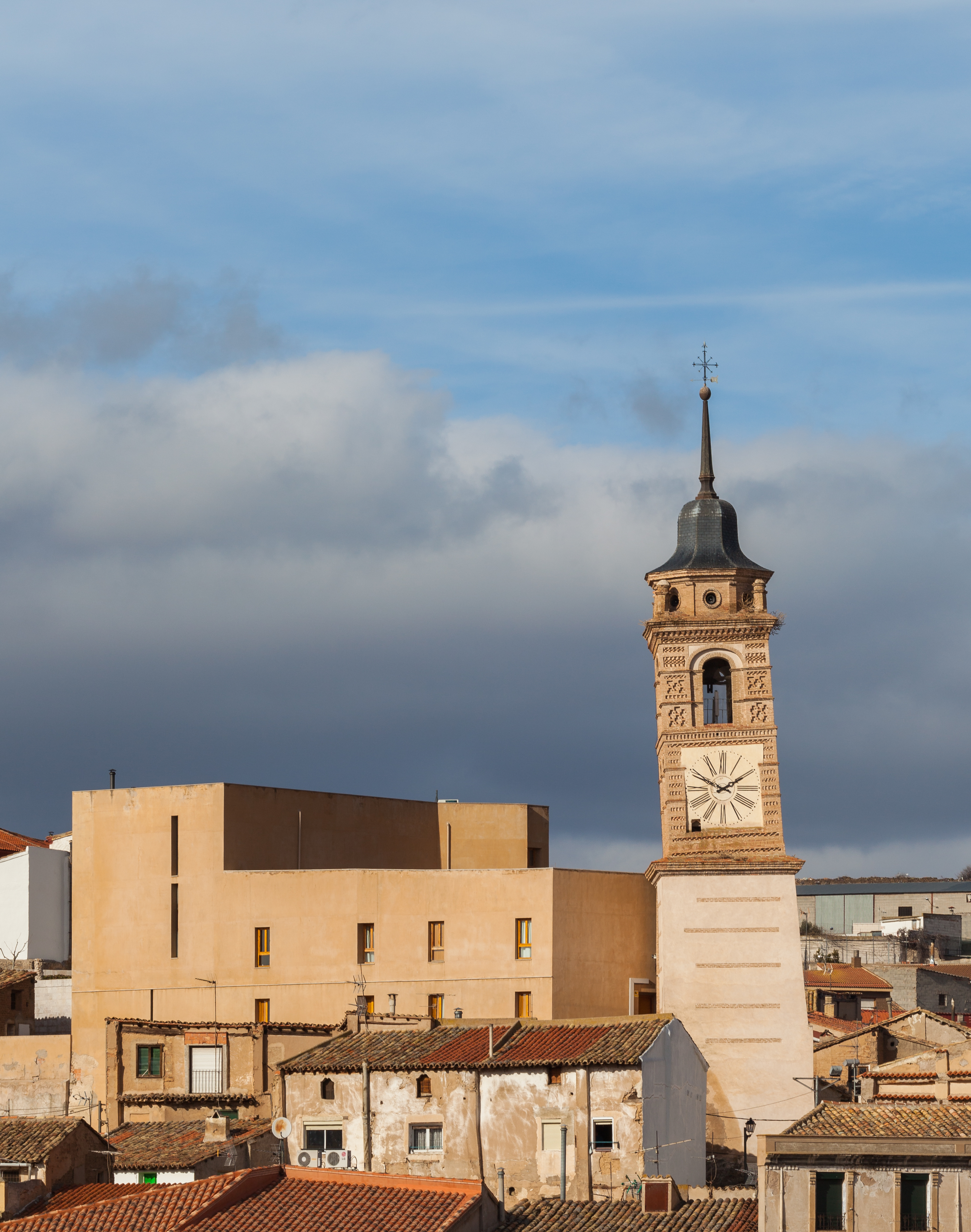

- Location within Spain
- Location: Ateca, Spain

Spanish Cultural Heritage
- Type: Non-movable
- Criteria: Bien Catalogado of the Aragonese Cultural Heritage
- Designated: January 12, 1983
- Reference no.: 1-INM-ZAR-020-038-004

The Clock Tower of Ateca is a structure in Ateca, Spain. A leaning tower of Mudejar style, it was built in 1560 on an ancient medieval tower of the castle of Ateca. The work was carried out by the masters Domingo and the Morisco Ameçot, a resident of Calatayud. On an old tower of the castle of Ateca, the bell tower was built, with Renaissance decoration and Mudéjar tradition.

== Description ==
It was built in 1560 by the master Domingo and the Morisco Ameçot and was carried out, specifically, to place a clock that was going to regulate the life of the town from that moment, probably following the Zaragoza influence of the Torre Nueva, that had the same purpose. The clock was installed in the year 1561 and was built in Zaragoza by Johan Escalante.

The Mudéjar tradition tower consists of two bodies crowned with an octagonal top. The lower body was built on a tower of the castle of Ateca and is built in mortar or plaster mortar, and presents the smooth walls. It is delimited by a cornice of brick of powerful flight. The upper body is built of brick and is also square but smaller; it is divided into two floors, the lower one contains the clock on one of its sides, and the other three have double blind semicircular windows. The octagonal top has eyelets on all sides, and from there the transition is made to the spire that covers the structure.

== Legal protection ==
By order of September 6, 2002, published in the BOA of September 30, 2002 of the Department of Culture and Tourism, it is declared Bien Catalogado of the Aragonese Cultural Heritage.

== Sources ==
- The information in this article is based on that in its Spanish equivalent.
