= Jalón (river) =

River in Spain

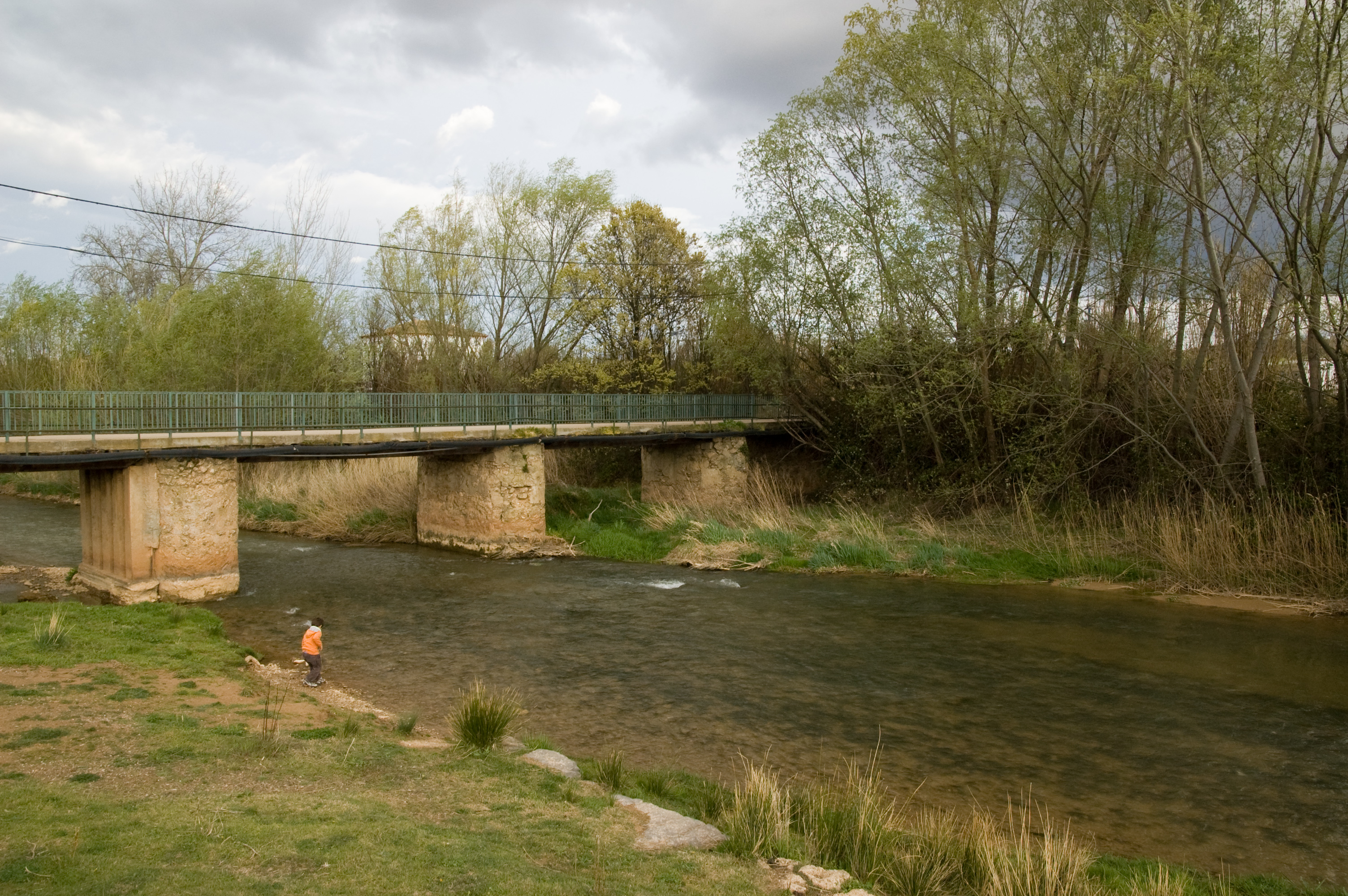
- The river Jalón in Terrer, Zaragoza (province).

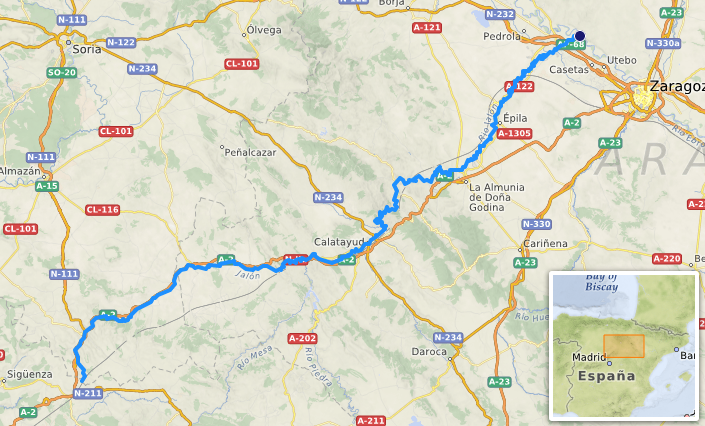
- Path of the Jalón river

Location
- Country: Spain

Physical characteristics
- Source: Esteras de Medinaceli
  - location: Medinaceli, Iberian System, Castile and León
  - coordinates: 41.092762°N 2.424388°W
  - elevation: 1,192 m (3,911 ft)
- Mouth: Ebro
  - location: Torres de Berrellén, Zaragoza, Aragón
  - coordinates: 41.777476°N 1.062856°W
  - elevation: 209 m (686 ft)
- Length: 224 km (139 mi)
- Basin size: 9,338 km^{2} (3,605 sq mi)
- Discharge
  - average: 20.8 m^{3}/s (730 cu ft/s)

Basin features
- Progression: Ebro→ Balearic Sea
- Tributaries
  - left: Nágima, Henar, Manubles, Isuela
  - right: Piedra, Jiloca
- River system: Ebro

The river Jalón (Latin: Salo) is located in the northeast of Spain, and is one of the principal tributaries of the Ebro. It has a length of 224 kilometres (139 mi) and drains a basin of 9,338 square kilometres (3,605 sq mi). The flow rate in Calatayud is 20.8 cubic metres per second (730 cu ft/s), but is highly irregular due to the great range of Mediterranean rainfall patterns.

The course of the river forms the main communication route between the Castilian Plateau and the Ebro. Until the late twentieth century, roads and railways between Madrid and Zaragoza followed this path.

== Geography ==
The Jalón rises in one of the springs at the foot of the Sierra Ministra, a hill in Esteras de Medinaceli, Medinaceli (Soria), and then runs through Arcos de Jalón, to Monreal de Ariza, province of Zaragoza, Aragón.

The tributary river Nágima joins at Monreal de Ariza and the Henar at Cetina before the river enters a limestone gorge at Alhama de Aragón. The Jalón then meanders through the Paleozoic zones of the Cordillera Ibérica near Bubierca, being joined by the Piedra and the Manubles at Ateca. At Calatayud, the river expands into a broad valley and is joined by the Jiloca, Perejiles and Ribota. The next section meanders through the Sierra de Algairén and the Sierra de la Virgen.

Once out of the mountains the river enters the Ebro valley and is joined by the rivers Aranda, Grío and Alpartir before joining the Ebro at Torres de Berrellén, a suburb of the city of Zaragoza.

== Ecology ==
Much of the course of the Jalón has been declared a Special Zone for Bird Protection. Birdlife includes falcons, eagles, and vultures. Other species include owls, wrens, and herons. Poplar, willow and ash. Carp, trout and eels were economically important in the past and are returning as pollution is being combated. The Plan Hidrológico del río Jalón, a river management plan, was adopted by the Spanish Ministry of the Environment and the governments of Aragon, Castile and León and Castile-La Mancha in 2007.

== Etymology ==
According to E. Bascuas, "Jalón" is a form belonging to the old European hydronymy, and derived from the Indoeuropean root *sal- 'flowing water, stream'.

Jalón means "Window" in Hebrew and pronounced exactly the same. Furthermore, Medinaceli, where the Jalón river originates, is also translatable to Hebrew as "My country" or "My refuge".

== See also ==
- List of rivers of Spain
- Ebro Hydrographic Confederation
