= Santa María (Ateca) =

Coordinates: 41°19′51″N 1°47′37″W

Church of St Mary
- Iglesia de Santa María (Spanish)
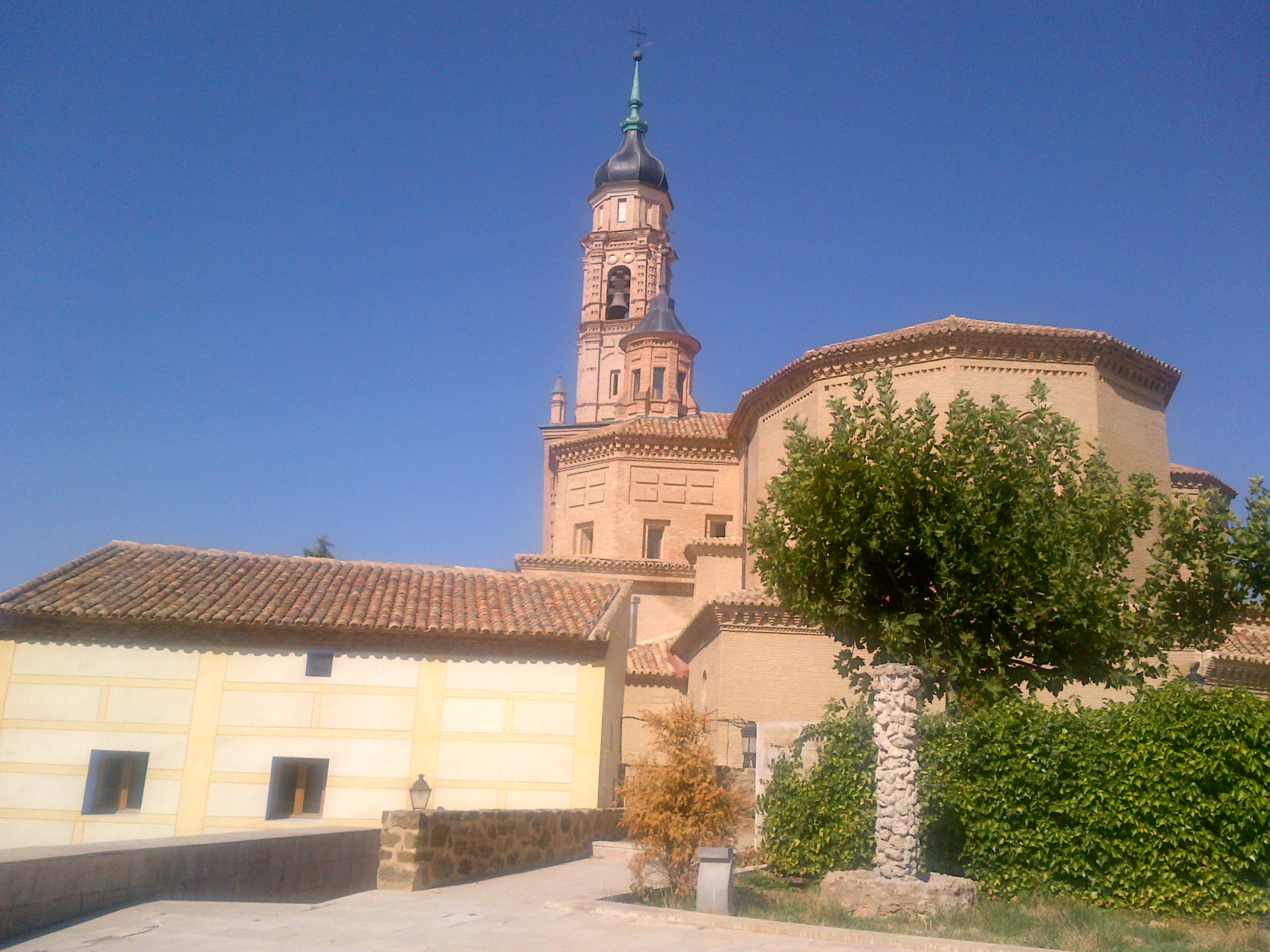

- Location within Spain
- Location: Ateca, Spain

Spanish Cultural Heritage
- Type: Non-movable
- Criteria: National monuments of Spain
- Designated: January 12, 1983
- Reference no.: RI-51-0004782

The Church of St Mary, iglesia de Santa María is a Roman Catholic church located in the municipality of Ateca in the province of Zaragoza, Spain. It is in the Diocese of Tarazona.

A medieval building, the church is in the Islamic-influenced style known as Mudéjar. It is one of a number of buildings in this architectural style to be found in the Autonomous Community of Aragon: it is not however included in the World Heritage Site the Mudéjar Architecture of Aragon.

== Description ==
=== The temple ===
It is a fortified church of the thirteenth century, built in brick. Its single nave has an heptagonal apse onto which various additions have been built over the centuries. Two original chapels are conserved next to the presbytery, one of the Ciria and one of the Ramírez, and four later-constructed chapels are also present, two on each side.

The chapel of the Virgen de la Peana is noteworthy for its 16th century baroque size and style, with a chapel for the Virgin of the early twentieth century. In this chapel are conserved two canvases of great dimensions. The first depicts the Virgen de la Peana, from the eighteenth century, and the other depicts La Soledad. Both have been recently restored, the latter being an example of ephemeral Spanish baroque architecture with the monument of Easter, a marvel of painted canvases that make the spectator believe that is before an example of real architecture and that nevertheless they do not stop being painted canvases with different tramoyas and curtains that can be raised and lowered at will. In this chapel, under the image of the Virgen de la Soledad, the image of the "Christ of the Cradle" has been placed inside a glass urn, the main processional step of Holy Week in Ateca, which was carved by the sculptor Bernardino Vililla towards 1661. In its origin this carving was an articulated image to be able to represent the descent of the cross until this representation was lost and the arms were fixed with nails to the body leaving it like lying image. Following the chapel of La Soledad on the north side of the church is the chapel of the Virgin of the Pillar with a 17th-century altarpiece and facing the chapel of the Child Jesus, next to which is the ascent to the bell tower.

The last section of the nave, (S.XVI) where the choir is located is an addition after the main factory of the church and facing the exterior has been heavily fortified, being built, unlike the rest of the church in limestone and with a gallery with pointed arches at its top. On the north side of the church there is a tower that probably dates from the fourteenth century from the time of the war of the two pebbles and that closes the chapel of the Virgin of the Pillar.

At the end of the eighteenth century the church has a neoclassical organ built in the workshop of the famous organist maestro Fernando Molero6 son-in-law of Julián de la Orden7 between 1798 and 1802, of excellent sonority that is completely restored and found located in the choir at the foot of the central nave. It has an excellent battle trumpet. Under the organ is the baptismal font.

From the main altarpiece dedicated to the Assumption of Mary, from the 17th century, made between 1650 and 1657 by Martin de la Almunia and Bernardo Ibáñez and polychrome by Juan de Lobera and his sons Jusepe and Francisco, the central image of the Virgin that came from the Monastery of Santa María de Huerta, of the century XVIII by which it had originally and that conserved in the sacristy. In the restoration of 2012 were found in this church the oldest Mudejar paintings of Aragon.

On the choir is preserved a polychrome gothic Christ of the end of century XIV of excellent invoice, of which the four evangelists who were probably at each end of the cross have been lost and that in the origins of the church would be presiding over the temple.

Worthy of mention are also the altarpieces of Santa Quiteria, dating from 1574 and the Annunciation, from the end of the 16th century, some objects of goldsmithing, a table top of Altar and red velvet Suit, from the sixteenth century.

== Bell tower ==
The bell tower of Santa Maria de Ateca is an Mudejar style tower in Aragon.

The base is of quadrangular plan and has two well-differentiated bodies. The lower body of the tower, has Almohade minaret structure with tower and counter-tower and according to some authors, could be an authentic Almohade tower of the end of the century XI belonging to the pre-existing mosque, other authors think that it is a Mudejar tower of the thirteenth century. The peculiarity of the construction, is that unlike other towers in which there is a central machón on which the staircase sits, in this tower, as in the Almohad minarets, there is an inner tower contained within which we see decorated and which are joined by stairs that are covered by half-barrel vaults and simple crucería. The inner tower is a succession of four superimposed rooms covered by vaults of different configuration. In the outer tower, the lower body vents are one trimmed and one recessed. The decoration has overlapping bands of pointed horseshoe arches, blades inscribed in squares, spikes, corners and pointed arches interspersed, all combined with ceramic bowls and pots of green color and honey very characteristic. During the recent restoration, in the hidden part of the tower, original ataifores (plates) with decorations of the Caliphate era have been found, which supports the thesis that it is an authentic Almohad tower of the XI century belonging to the preexisting mosque.

Initially this tower was exempt of the church being united to the same one in the works of extension of century XVI.

The upper body is an added Baroque that was made to replace the old bell-shaped body that, according to hypothesis, could have been similar to the tower of the Church of San Miguel Arcángel (Belmonte de Gracián) .

The whole set was declared of Cultural Interest in the category of Monument by Royal Decree on January 12, 1983.

== See also ==
- List of Bien de Interés Cultural in the Province of Zaragoza

== Sources ==
- The information in this article is based on that in its Spanish equivalent.
