= Camino del Cid =

Cultural and tourist route across Spain

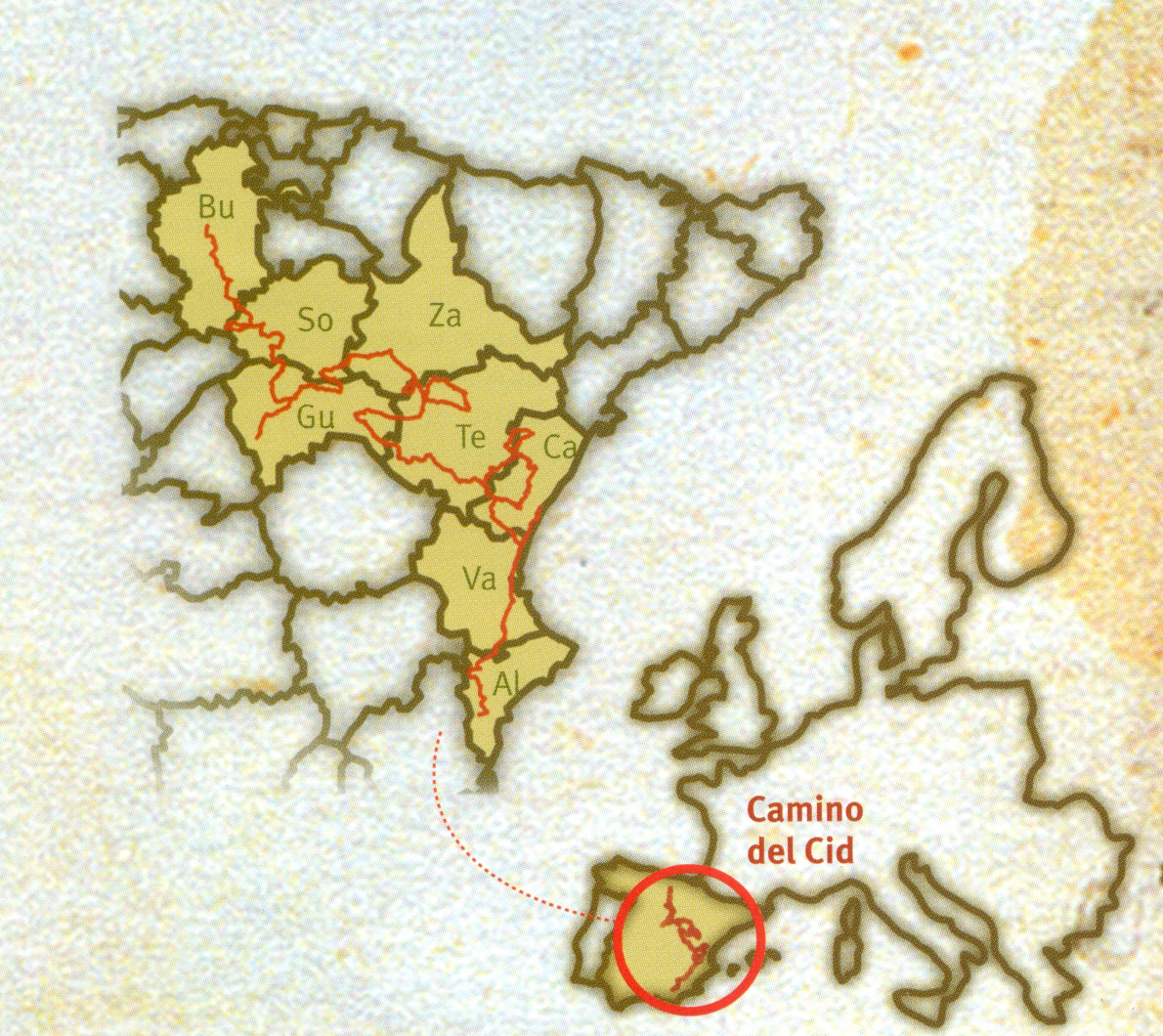
The Camino del Cid

El Camino del Cid (English: "The Way of the Cid") is a cultural and tourist route that crosses Spain from Castile and León in the northwest to Alicante and the Mediterranean coast in the southeast. It follows the history and the legend of Rodrigo Díaz de Vivar, known as El Cid, a medieval knight of the 11th century who is one of Spain’s most important folk heroes. El Cid is also a well-known literary character as the protagonist of El Cantar de mio Cid, a Spanish medieval epic poem written at the end of the 12th century or beginning of the 13th. The main travel guide for the route is the Cantar itself, which tells of the adventures of El Cid following his exile, fighting to survive against both Moors and Christians.

The route crosses eight Spanish provinces (Burgos, Soria, Guadalajara, Zaragoza, Teruel, Castellón, Valencia and Alicante) belonging to four Autonomous Communities (Castile and Leon, Castilla-La Mancha, Aragon and the Valencian Community). Owing to its great length, around 1400 kilometres of tracks and 2000 km of roads, the Camino del Cid is divided into interconnected thematic routes, each approximately 50 to 300 km in length.

== Origins of the Camino del Cid ==
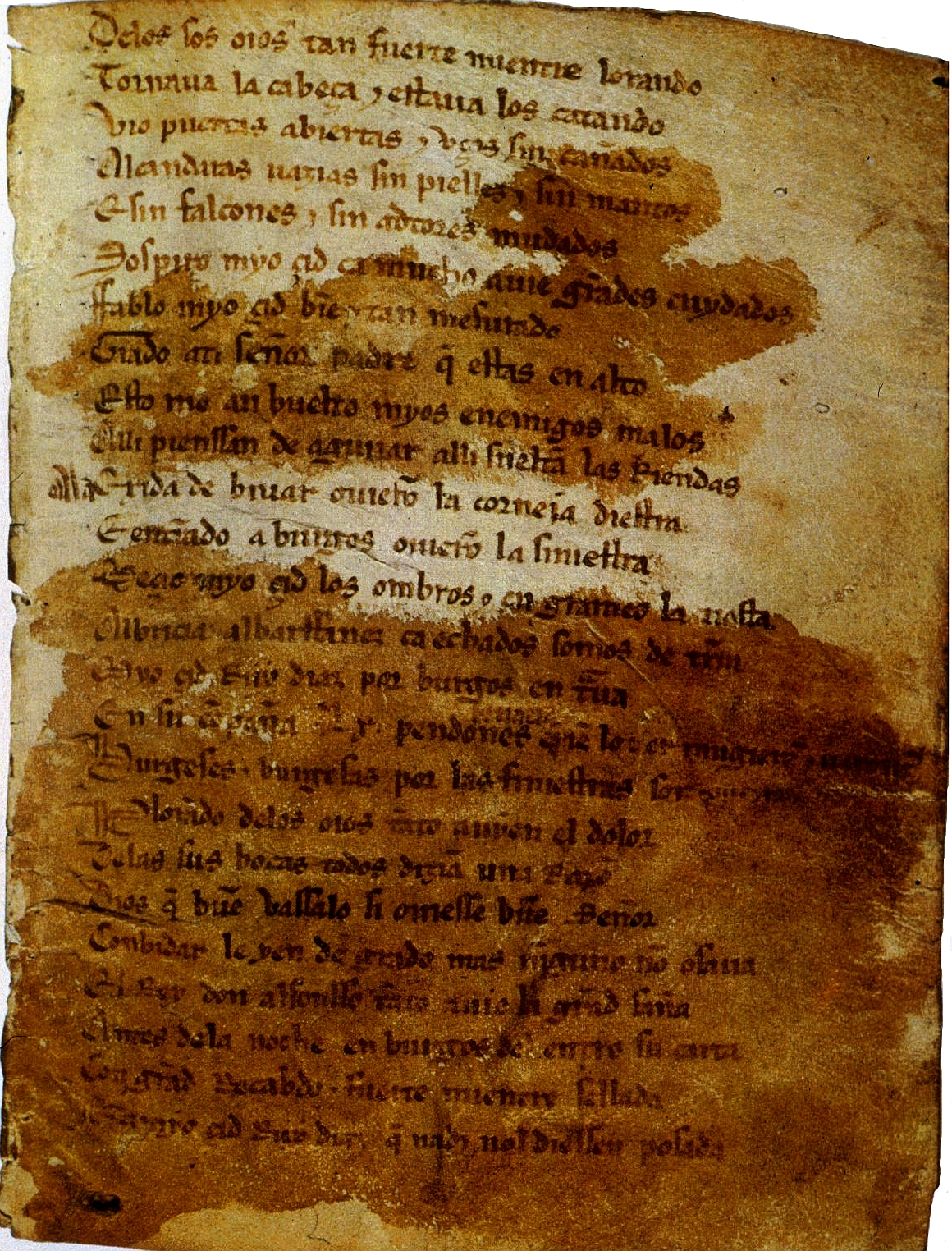
Cantar de mio Cid f. 1r (rep)

The Camino del Cid is an travel itinerary inspired by El Cantar de mio Cid. In it, the author makes references to both history and fiction. The route taken by the historic Cid does not correspond exactly with that described in the poem. The author would have used available historical references added to his own knowledge of geography to draw a route traced mainly by Roman roads, trade routes, and historic paths. This network of paths, some of which still exist today, began to be traveled as itineraries of the Cid by Archer Milton Huntington, founder of the Hispanic Society of America, towards the end of the 19th century, who was followed shortly thereafter by the philologist Ramón Menéndez Pidal and his wife Maria Goyri as they searched for traces of El Cid through Castilian and Aragonese lands.

With only a few exceptions, travellers on the modern route come across all the scenarios mentioned in the poem. In some cases, some villages have been associated with the same place name, as is the case of El Robledal de Corpes. The location of this place, which is where the imaginary affront to El Cid's daughters occurs, has captured the attention of many academics.

== Places of interest ==
The Camino del Cid has a diversity of resources. There are monuments of medieval origin that are listed as World Heritage Sites: in Burgos, the Gothic cathedral and the Way of Saint James; Mudéjar Architecture of Aragon, a style of architecture of Islamic influence; in Valencia, the Water Tribunal of the Plain of Valencia and the Gothic Silk Market; in Algemesí (Valencia) the Festivity of La Mare de Déu de la Salut, and in Alicante, the Palmeral of Elche and the Mystery Play of Elche. In a dozen or so villages there are examples of the cave paintings of the Mediterranean Arch, declared a World Heritage Site in 1998.

The Way of El Cid has 39 villages declared Historical and/or Artistic Sites by the Spanish government such as Covarrubias (Burgos), Burgo de Osma (Soria), Sigüenza (Guadalajara), Calatayud, Ateca and Daroca (Zaragoza), Albarracín (Teruel), Morella (Castellón), Xàtiva (Valencia) and Elche and Orihuela (Alicante).

There are also other sites of interest. There are examples of Romanesque, Mozarabic, Mudejar, Islamic and Gothic art coexisting in harmony as well as valuable landscapes such as the fields of de Genèvrier in Arlanza (Burgos), the Parque natural del Alto Tajo (Guadalajara), the Laguna de Gallocanta (Zaragoza), the Sierra de Maestrazgo (Teruel and Castellón), the lake and Albufera Natural Park of Valencia or the Palmeral of Elche (Alicante).

Most of the Way of El Cid crosses areas that were borderland, not only during the Middle Ages. This has ensured the conservation of a good number of castles, lookout towers and military constructions built at strategic locations to defend or watch over mountain passes and valleys. Some of these buildings have been refurbished, while others are in ruins.

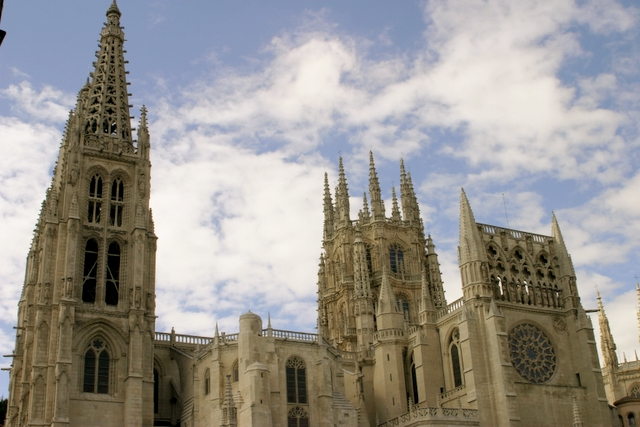
Burgos Cathedral

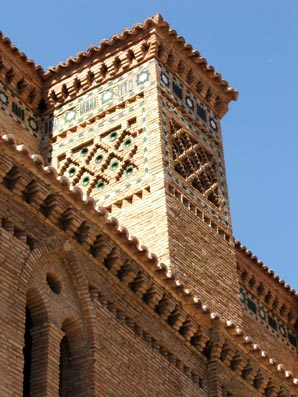
Mudejar architecture of Aragon

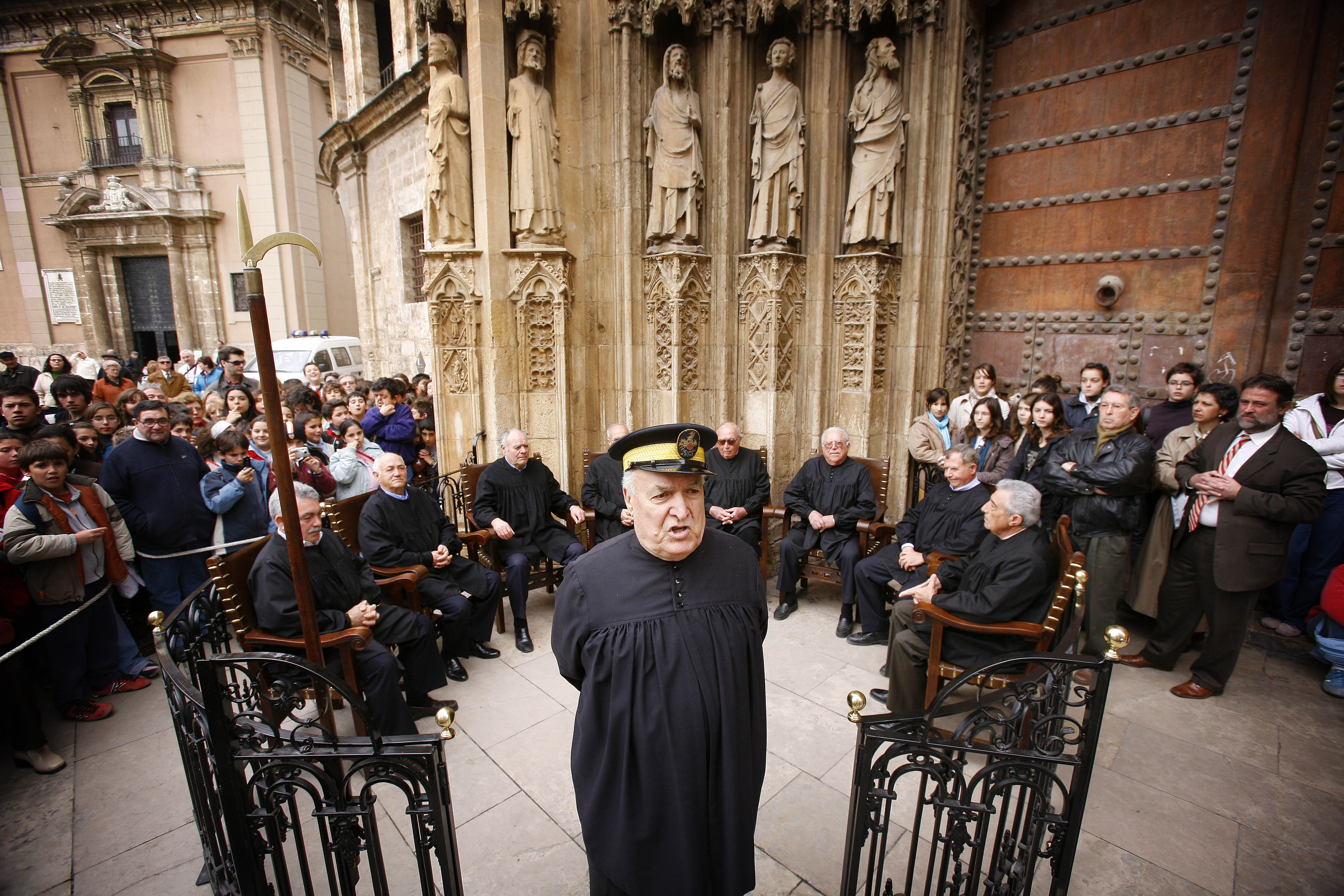
The Tribunal de las Aguas of Valencia

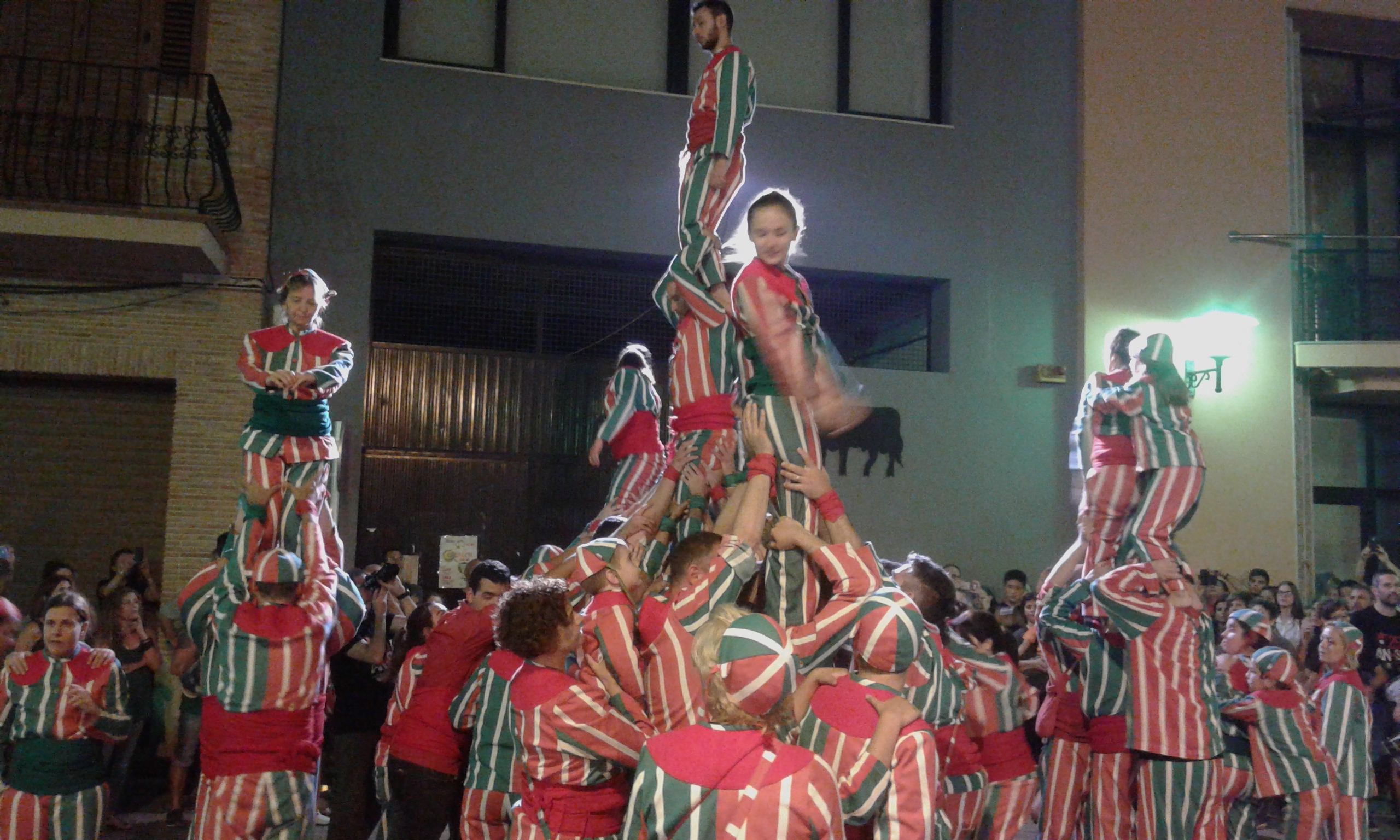
Muixeranga of Algemesí

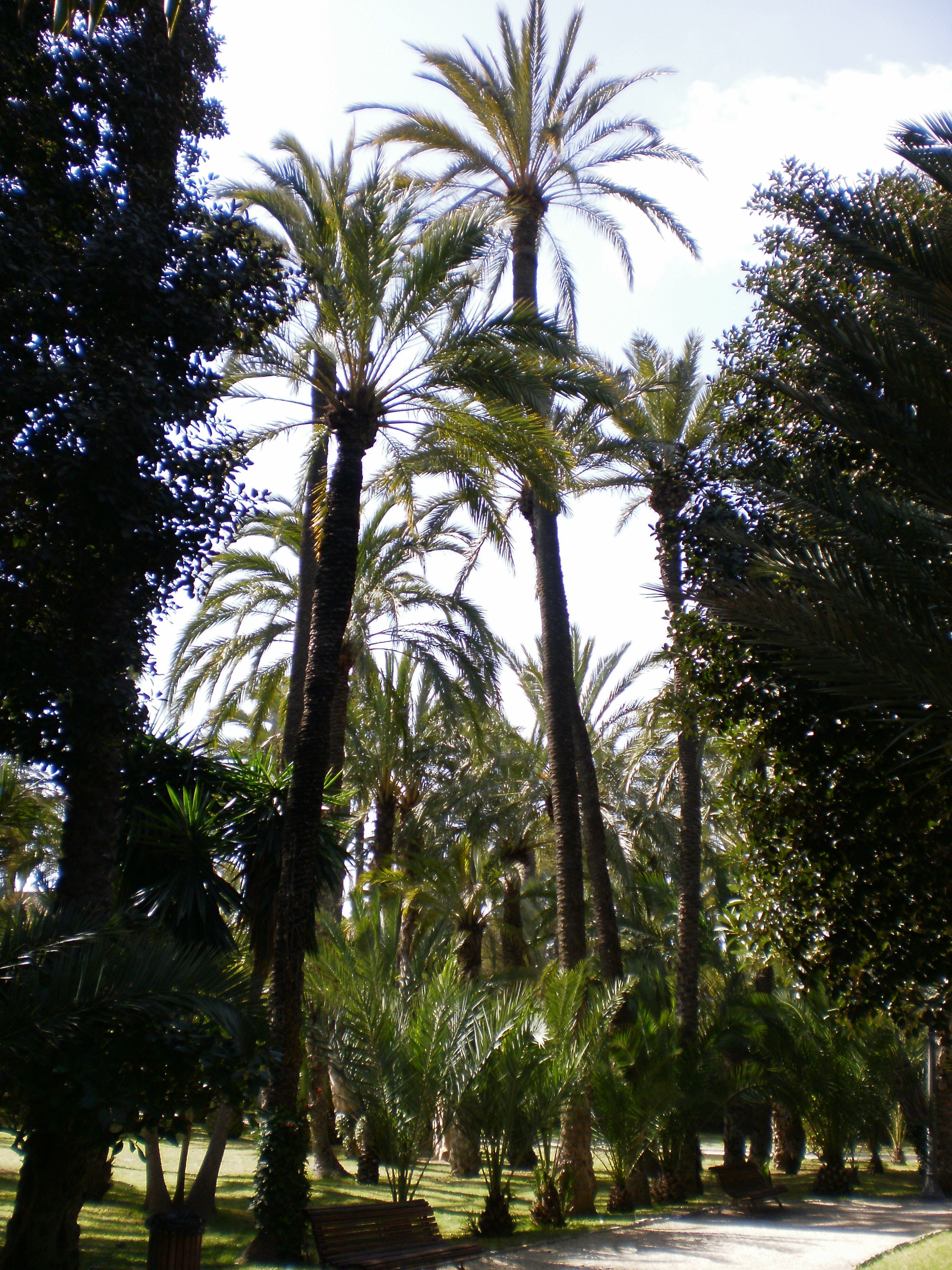
Palmeral of Elche

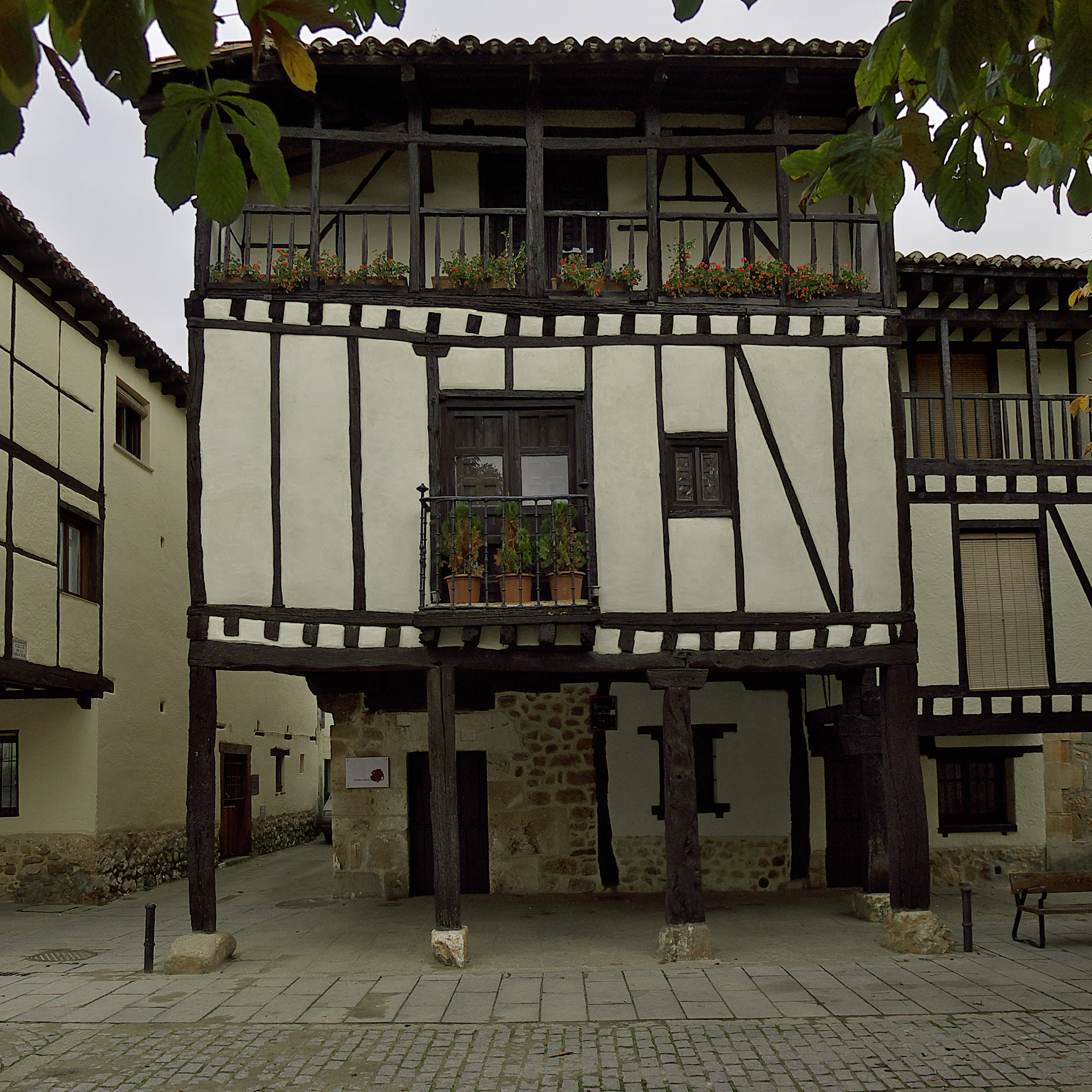
Covarrubias, Burgos

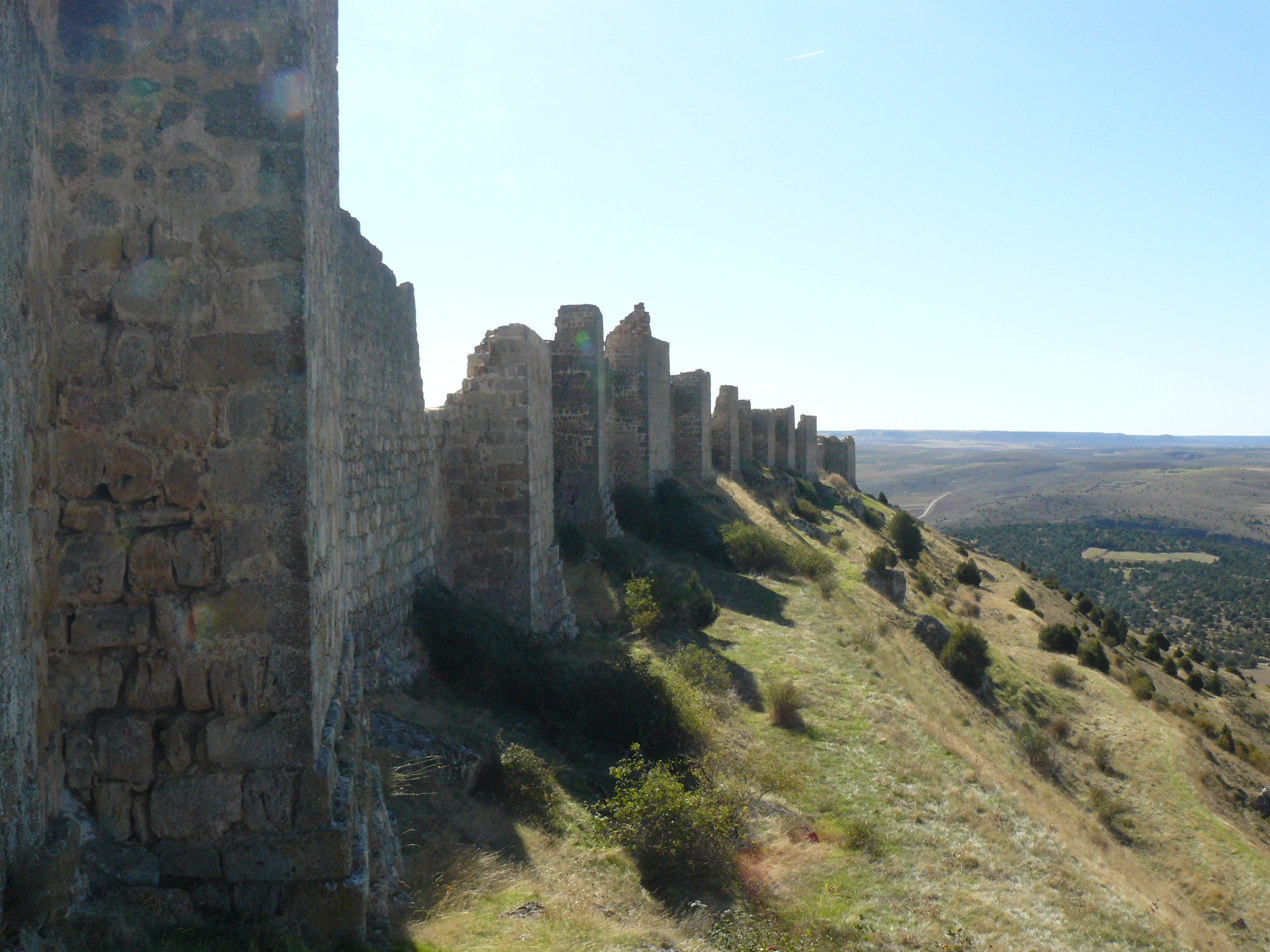
View north of the castle of Gormaz, Soria

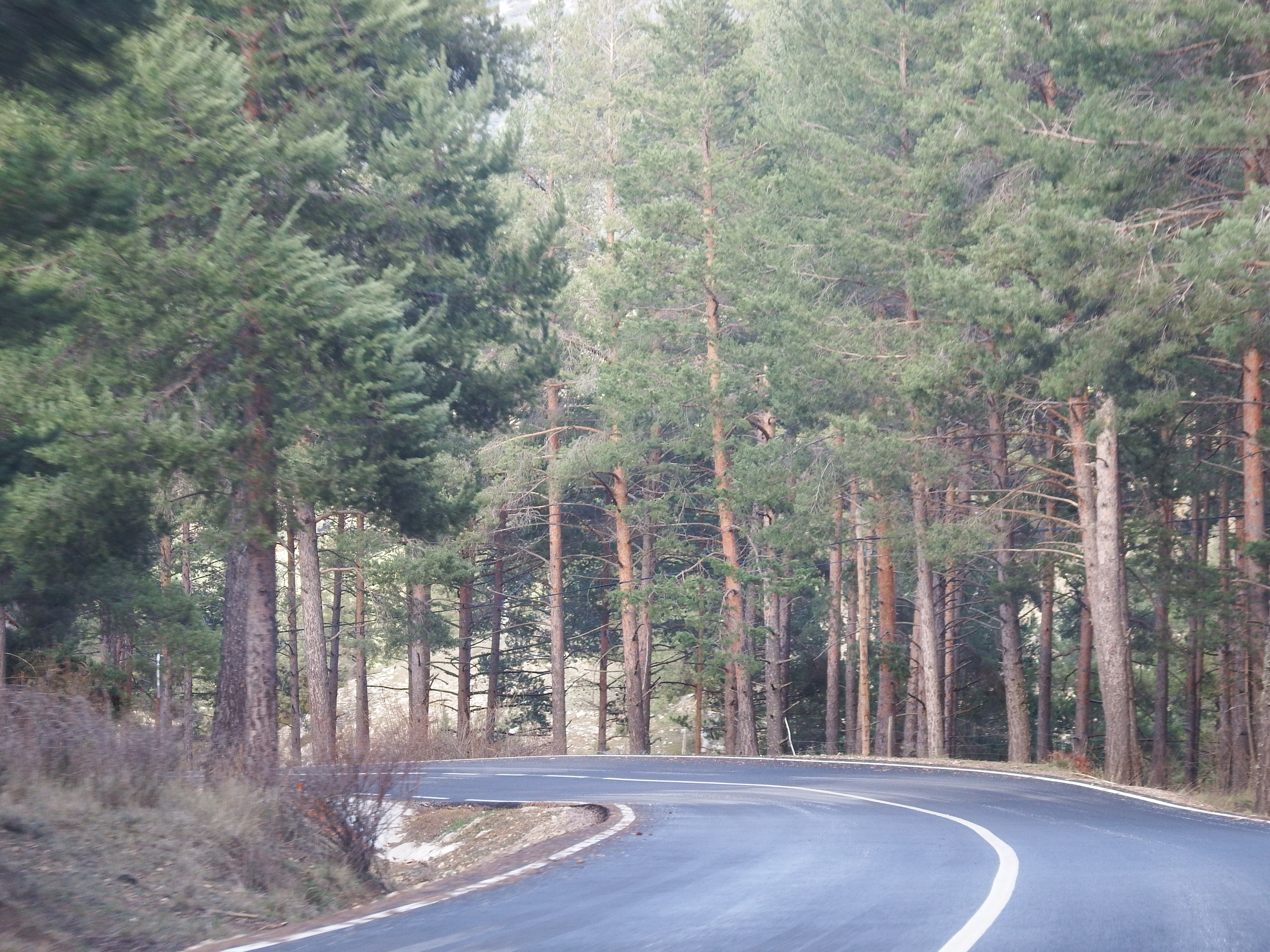
Parque Natural del Alto Tajo, Guadalajara

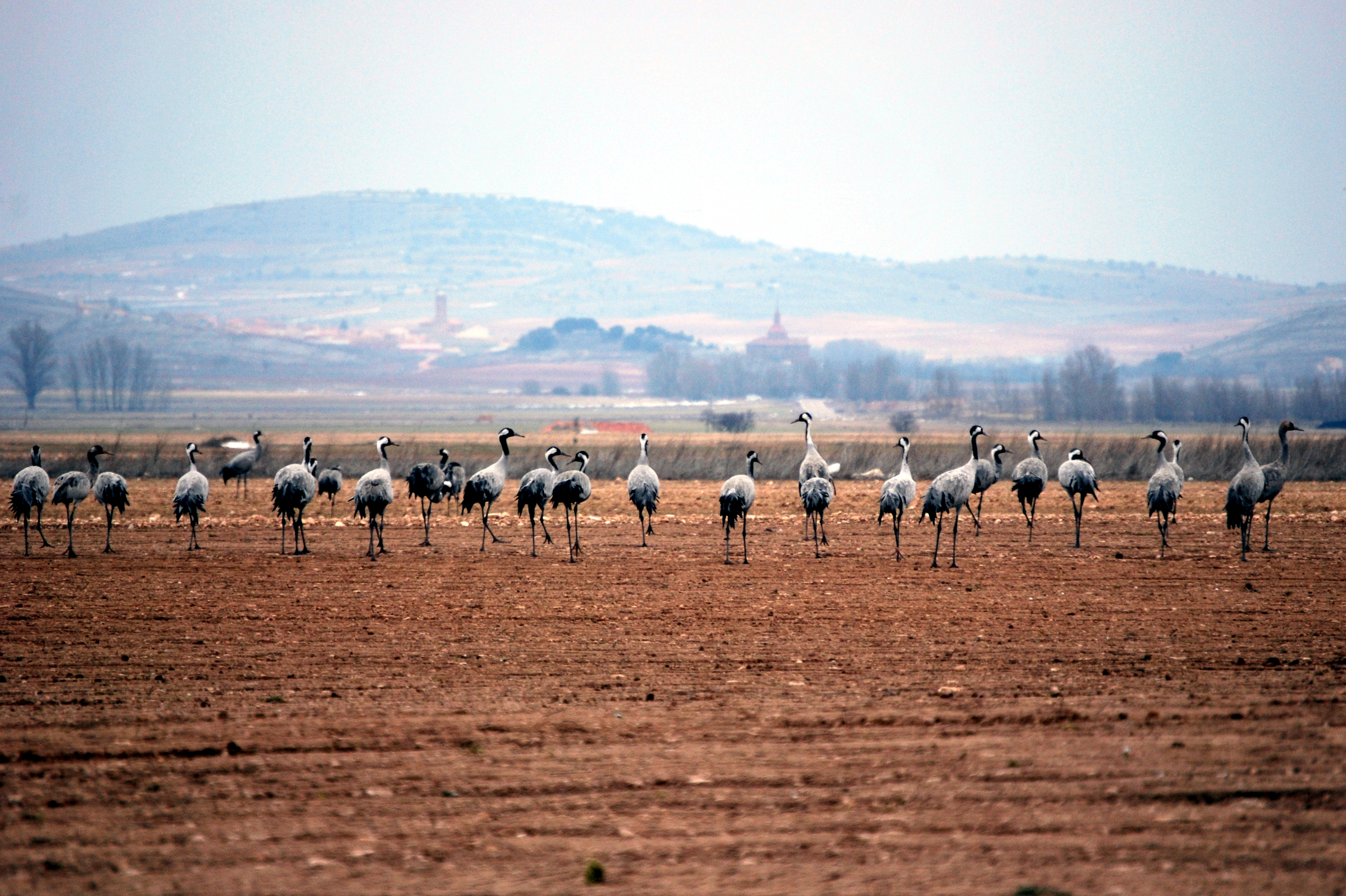
Gallocanta lake, Zaragoza

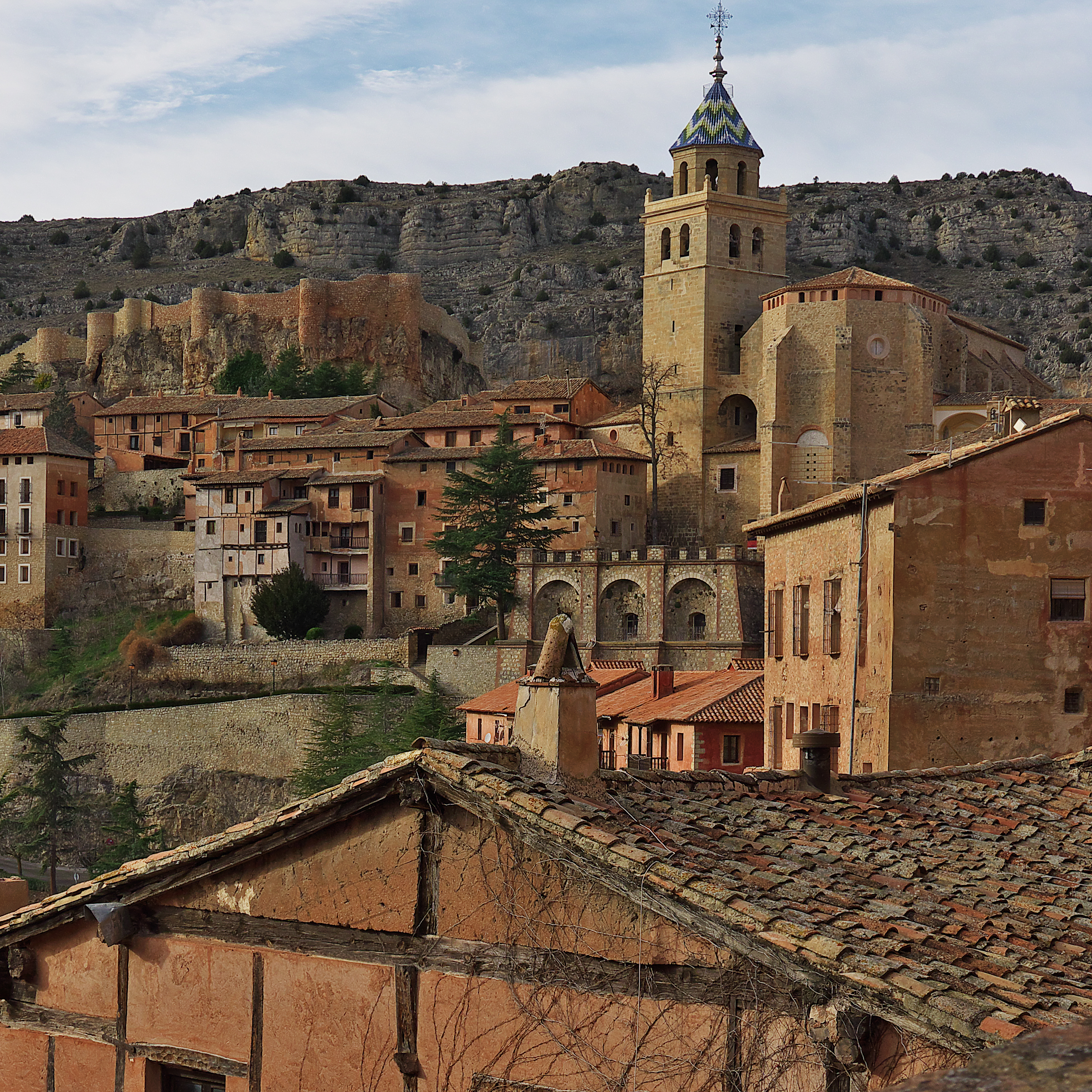
Albarracín, Teruel

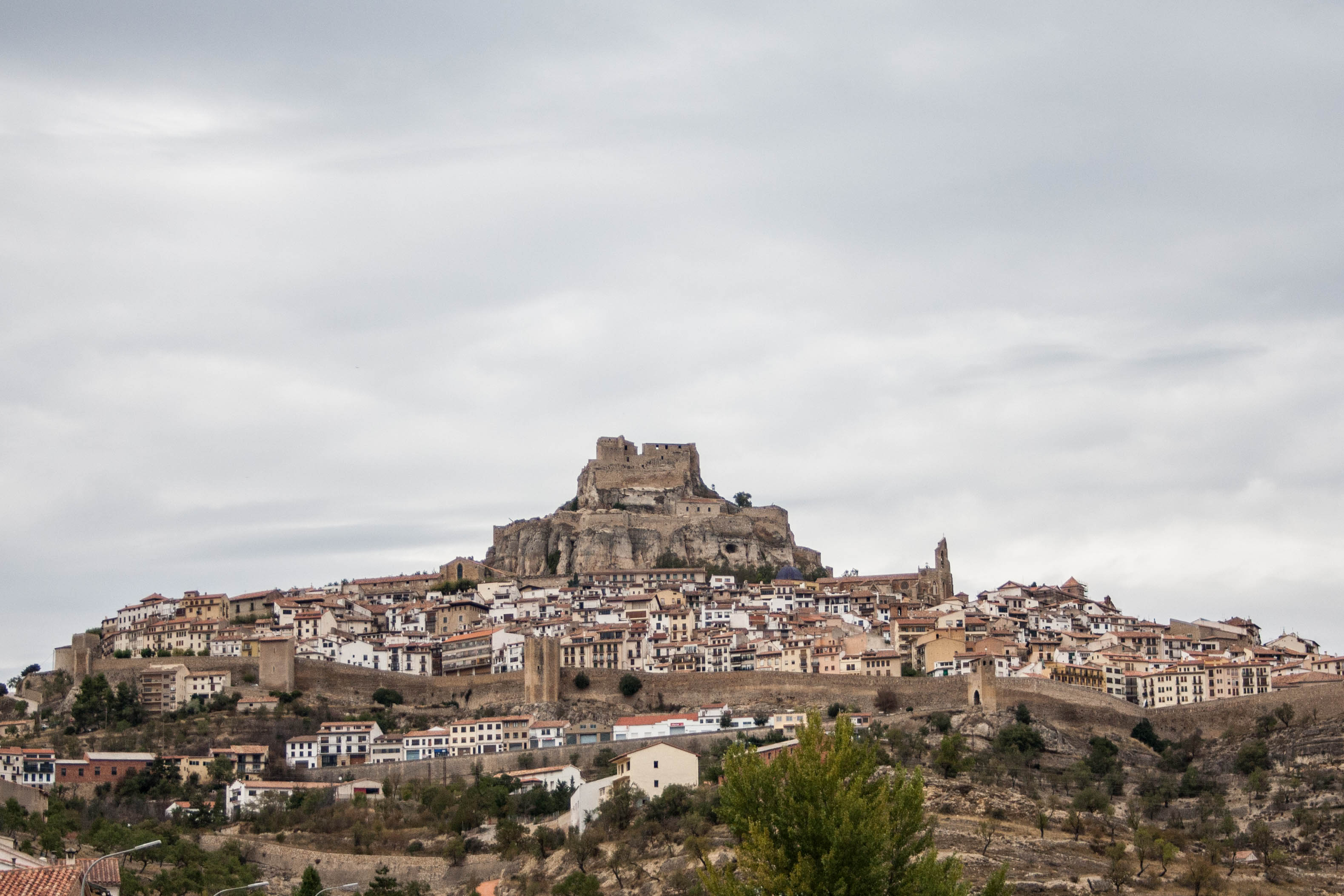
Morella, Castellón

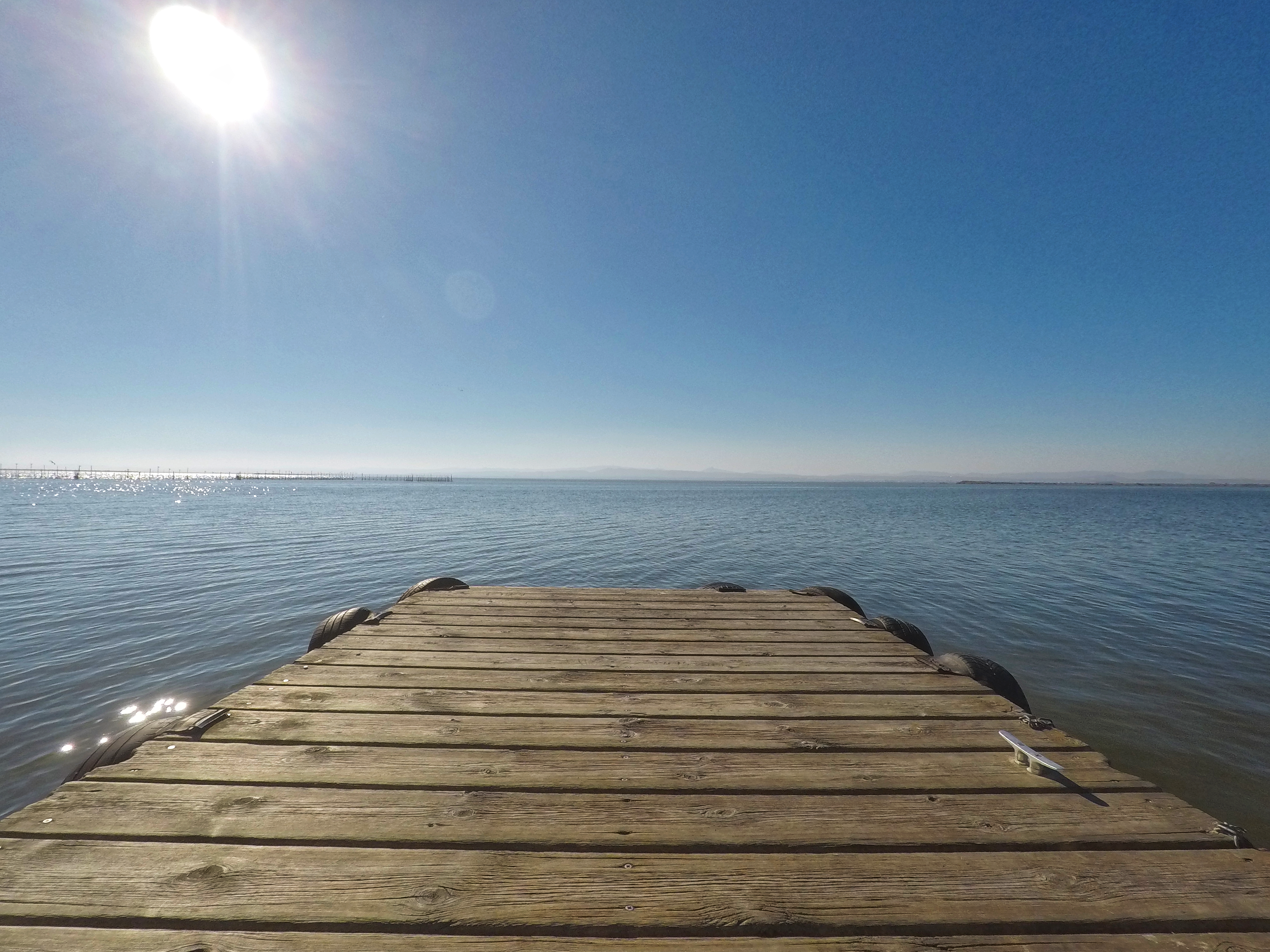
Albufera, Valencia

== How to Travel The Way of el Cid ==
There are four ways of following the itinerary:

=== Hiking routes ===
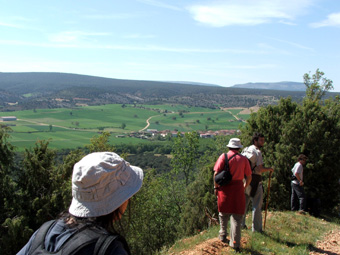
The way for hikers

The Way of El Cid for hikers covers a total length of 1497 km. It is divided into seven thematic routes joined over a length of between 50 and 308 km. All the routes are signposted and most have been approved as long-distance hiking tracks (GR 160 – Way of El Cid). These routes follow mainly historical or traditional routes and country roads across a geography of plains, mountains, valleys, hills and coastline. The routes are taken by all hikers, and do not require any special technical skills beyond the basics needed for long-distance walking. The information sheets for the routes have guides, tracks, and accommodation options.

=== Routes for mountain biking ===
The Way of El Cid for mountain bikes, all-terrain bikes, cross country bikes and all mountain bikes is 1509 km long. It is separated into 7 signposted routes that are joined, each of between 49 and 313 km. 29” hybrid or trekking bikes with knobs can also travel along this route. The MTB route follows 88% of the hiking route. The remaining 12% is covered along signposted MTB alternatives, created specifically so that cyclists can avoid some of the more difficult or technical hiking sections. These alternatives run along country or minor roads and, after overcoming the difficulties involved, they return to the hiking route. All the routes are signposted: the hiking routes have their own signs and the BTT alternatives have international MTB signs supervised by IMBA Spain.

=== Road cycling tourism routes ===
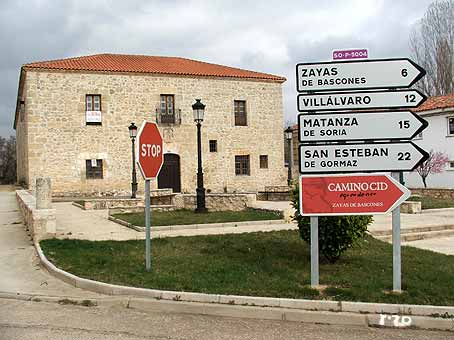
The Way of El Cid

The road cycling routes on the Way of El Cid (touring, trekking, hybrid and road bikes) cover a length of 2041 km. There are 10 routes of between 66 and 362 km long. The roads are mainly quiet minor roads with little or hardly any traffic. However, there are also some sections along regional and national roads and connections to dual carriageways: in general, but not always, these roads have a generous hard shoulder.

The cycling tourist routes are suitable to cyclists with all kinds of bikes: from road to all-terrain. The bikes best suited to these routes are the gravel´s and the touring bikes (also called trekking, or hybrid) owing to their versatility: In comparison with mountain bikes, touring and gravel bikes are faster, especially on flats and downhill sections. They are more comfortable than racing bikes when the road surface is in bad condition or wet, but they also let tourists change over to the mountain bike routes (MTB): many sections are very easy and comfortable for trekking bikes.

=== Routes by car or motorbike ===
The routes by road along the Way of El Cid cover 2021 km and cross a wide variety of lands. There are 11 routes of between 45 and 357 km each, joined so that can combining.

Most of the roads are unique minor roads. Some of the routes represent a classic among long distance routes. Much of the route for vehicles is also the route for road bikes.

== The Way of el Cid credential ==
The Letter of Safe Conduct is the credential that features the stamps of the various towns and villages travellers pass through. It is based on the document used during the Middle Ages to ensure that travellers and goods were allowed to travel freely and safely.

It is a memento of the experience traveling the Way of El Cid: the stamps are much sought after. The collection was designed by Julián de Velasco. Also it It is a way of discovering the history of the towns and villages pass through The Way of el Cid: each stamp reminds of a historic or legendary event, or part of the local heritage.

The Letter of Safe Conduct entitles travellers to discounts of around 10% at more than two hundred accommodation options on the Way of El Cid. In addition, travellers can use the Letter of Safe Conduct to take advantage regular promotions and free gifts, including bracelets, badges, caps, bandolera scarves and T-shirts, etc. Upon collecting four stamps from at least seven of the eight provinces the Way passes through, travellers receive the Way of El Cid certificate free of charge.

The Letter of Safe Conduct is free of charge, and can be applied by mail or in-person at any of the 81 Tourist Information Offices located along the Way of El Cid.
