= Terrer =

Coordinates: 41°19′36″N 1°42′44″W

Terrer, Spain
- Flag Coat of arms
- Interactive map of Terrer, Spain
- Country: Spain
- Autonomous community: Aragon
- Province: Zaragoza
- Municipality: Terrer

Area
  - Total: 33.8 km^{2} (13.1 sq mi)

Population (2025-01-01)
  - Total: 580
  - Density: 17/km^{2} (44/sq mi)
- Time zone: UTC+1 (CET)
  - Summer (DST): UTC+2 (CEST)
- Website: ayuntamientodeterrer.com

Terrer is a municipality located in the province of Zaragoza, Aragon, Spain.

== Population ==
According to the 2007 census (INE), the municipality has a population of 541 inhabitants.

It appears in the Cantar de Mio Cid.

== See also ==
- List of municipalities in Zaragoza
