= Contamina =

- municipality
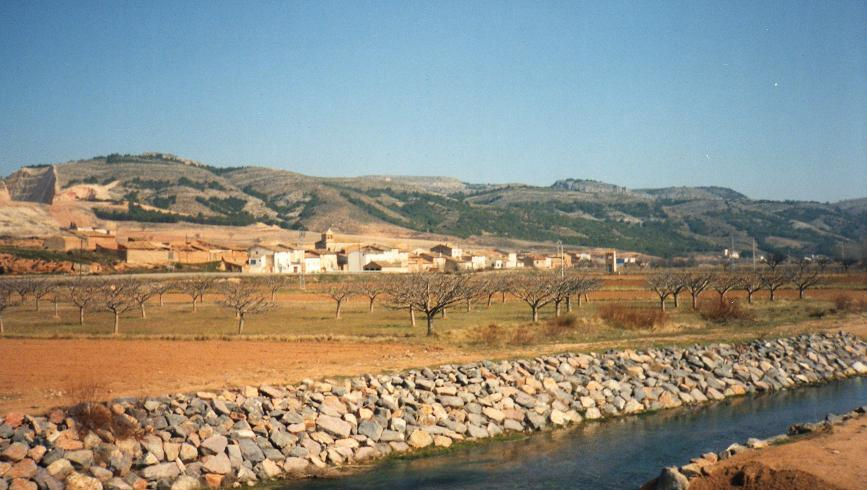

- Flag Coat of arms

- Location within Aragon Location within Spain Location within Europe
- Country: Spain
- Autonomous community: Aragon
- Province: Zaragoza
- Comarca: Comunidad de Calatayud

Area
  - Total: 13 km^{2} (5.0 sq mi)

Population (2025-01-01)
  - Total: 34
  - Density: 2.6/km^{2} (6.8/sq mi)
- Time zone: UTC+1 (CET)
  - Summer (DST): UTC+2 (CEST)
- Website: http://www.ayto-contamina.com/

Contamina is a municipality located in the province of Zaragoza, Aragón, Spain to the west of the Sierra de Padros, in the upper valley of the river Jalón, a tributary of the Ebro. At the 2008 census (Instituto Nacional de Estadística) the municipality had a population of 42 inhabitants. In 1930 the population was 252. The 16th-century parish church is dedicated to St Bartholomew and is constructed in the baroque style. It has a notable 16th-century altar depicting the life of Saint Bartholomew in eight panels.

The novel Secuestro y fonda de Cela en Contamina by José de Cora, is set in the Contamina; it is a fictional history of the kidnapping of 1989 Nobel Prize winner Camilo José Cela by three local inhabitants.

Two kilometres to the east lies the spa town of Alhama de Aragón. The main highway between Zaragoza and Madrid skirts the northern edge of the settlement. This is a rural community with arable and fruit farms. There is a restaurant and a casa rural (self catering accommodation).

A few kilometres to the south-east lies the Tranquera reservoir and the ancient Monasterio de Piedra with its famous water gardens.

== History ==
The origin of the name Contamina is believed to be from the Latin CONDOMIN(I)A (joint domain). Contamina used to lie on the Camino Real, the royal highway to Madrid, and in the Middle Ages was the location of stables for royal post horses. In 1361 king Pedro IV gave the manor of Contamina to Pedro Carrillo. In 1646 Contamina was granted by king Felipe IV to Sr. Juan Fernandez de Heredia of Cetina, who became Conde de Contamina. In the diaries of Elizabeth, Lady Holland, the Conde de Contamina was mentioned favourably as a supporter of the English cause against Napoleon during the Peninsular War.

During the Spanish Civil War Contamina remained in the Nationalist Zone following occupation of most of the province of Zaragoza by Franco's Nationalist forces in the summer of 1936. Five residents of the village were murdered by nationalist forces in 1936.

== Fiestas ==
- 24 August, Saint Bartholomew
- First Sunday in October, Virgen del Rosario.

== Nearby places ==
- Alhama de Aragon
- Ariza
- Cetina
- Monasterio de Piedra
- Nuevalos

== See also ==
- List of municipalities in Zaragoza
