= Castle of Zafra (Guadalajara) =

Castle in Guadalajara, Spain

Castle Of Zafra
- Campillo de Dueñas, Spain
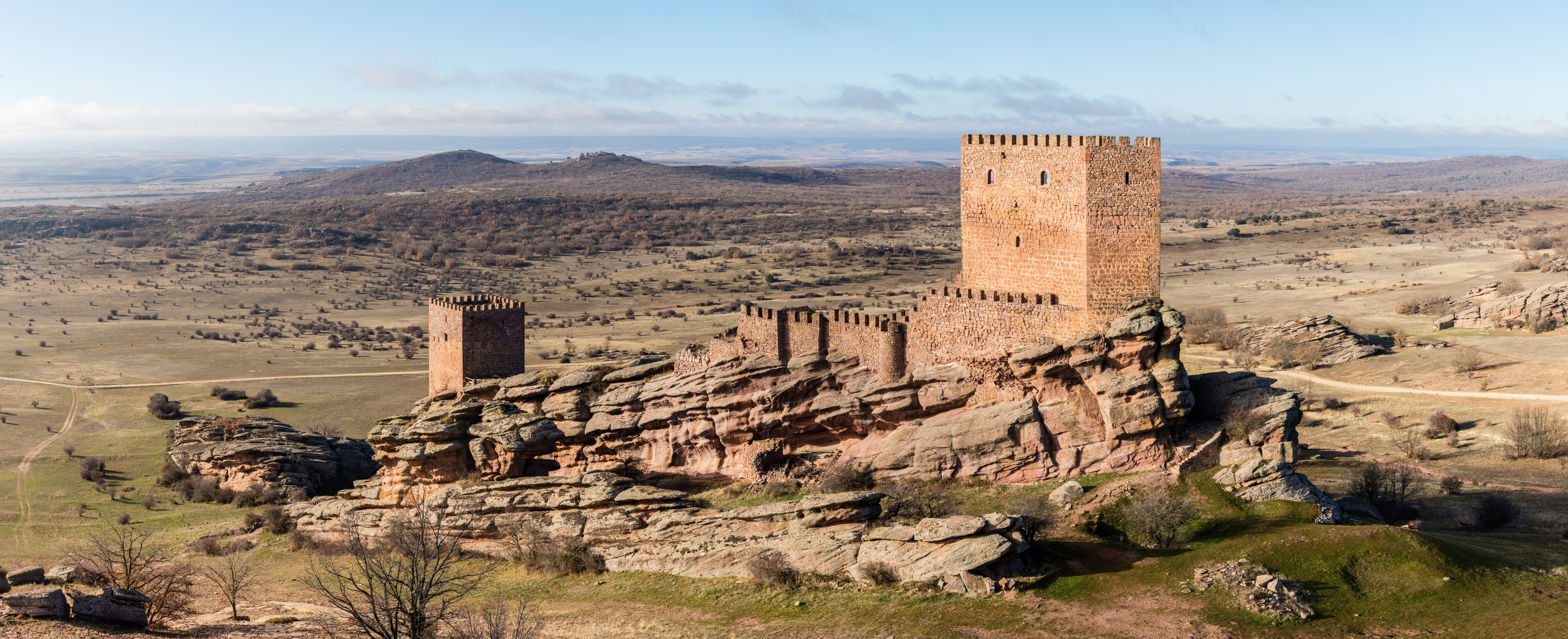
- Exterior view of the Castle of Zafra

Site information
- Type: Fortification
- Owner: Private
- Condition: Partly restored, otherwise ruined

Location
- Location within Spain
- Coordinates: 40°50′05″N 01°42′23″W

Site history
- Built: Late 12th or early 13th century
- Built by: Kingdom of Aragon
- In use: 12th or 13th – 16th centuries
- Materials: Sandstone

The Castle of Zafra (Spanish: Castillo de Zafra) is a 12th-century castle in the municipality of Campillo de Dueñas, in Guadalajara, Spain. Built in the late 12th or early 13th century on a sandstone outcrop in the Sierra de Caldereros, it stands on the site of a former Visigothic and Berber fortification that fell into Christian hands in 1129. It had considerable strategic importance as a virtually impregnable defensive work on the border between Christian and Muslim-ruled territory.

The castle was never conquered and was successfully defended against the King of Castile in the 13th century. The completion of the Reconquista at the end of the 15th century ended its military significance. Although it fell into ruin in the following centuries, since 1971 it has progressively been restored by its private owners. It can be visited with permission from the owners.

== Etymology ==
The namesake of the castle, zafra, is a somewhat contested term linguistically. It is accepted that the word entered Spanish from Arabic, but there is some disagreement about the precise origins of the word and its significance in Spanish. In Spanish speaking countries the word zafra refers to the late summer or early autumn harvest of crops such as sugarcane, a staple brought from Arab lands. Some believe the term is derived from the Arabic zāfar or zafariya meaning "harvest time", while others believe the term derives from saʼifah meaning "gathering time".

== Description ==
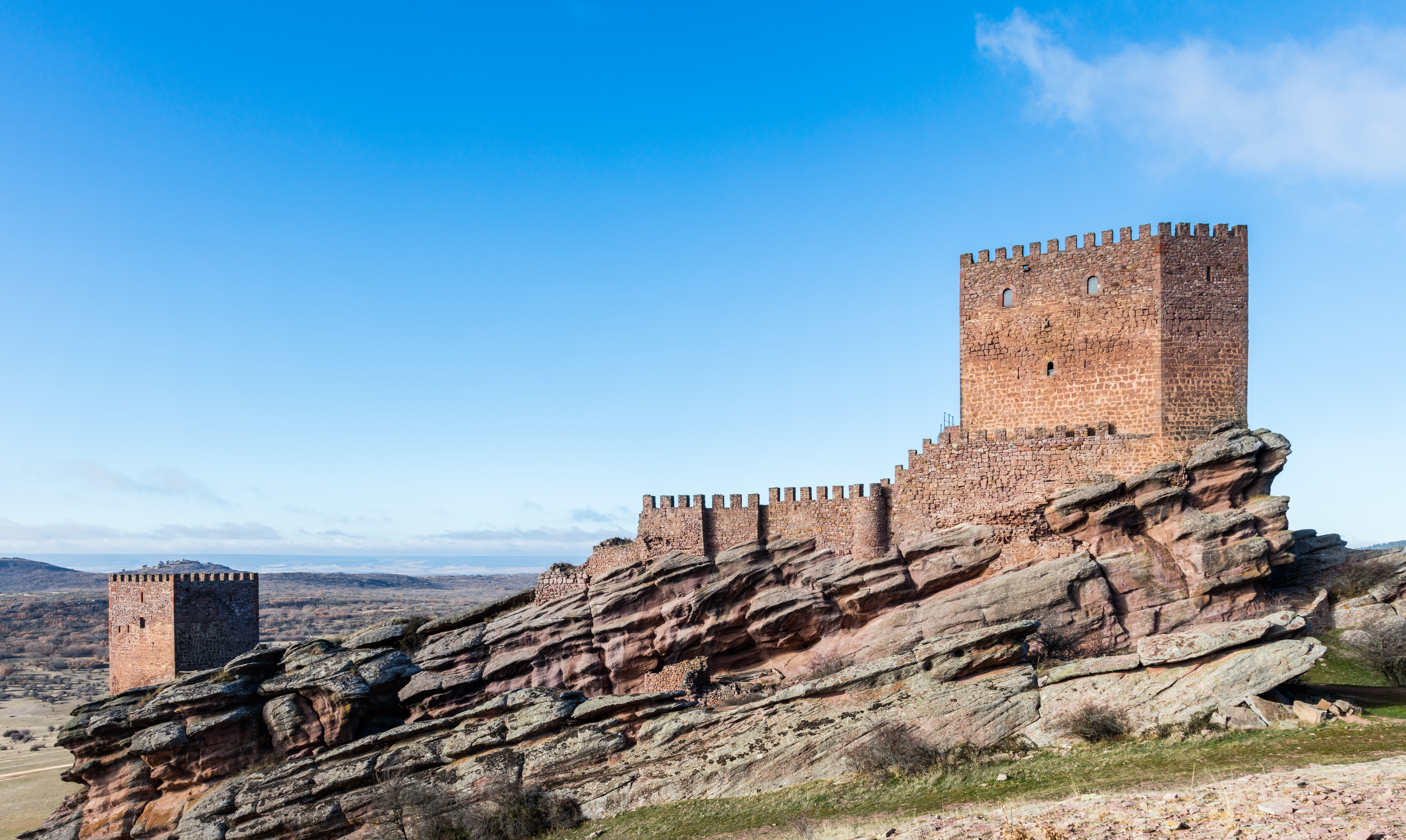
View of the castle from the south. The entrance tower is on the left; the keep stands on the right of the picture.

The castle stands on a large rock in the Vega de Zafra at an elevation of 1,400 metres (4,600 ft) in the Sierra de Caldereros. The upland area is characterised by sloping meadows interspersed with heavily-eroded sandstone outcrops, one of which is occupied by the castle. It occupies the whole of the outcrop, which runs in a north-east to south-west alignment. A wall encloses the top of the outcrop, linking the entrance tower at the south-west end to the main buildings at the north-east end. Traces of buildings – possibly part of an outer enclosure that might have incorporated structures such as stables or supply stores – can be seen in the meadow surrounding the castle.

There are four principal areas within the wall. At the far south-west end is the entrance tower, after which is an open courtyard. This in turn leads to the enclosed Place of Arms, a troop assembly area within which were the castle's cisterns. This gave access to the highest point of the outcrop, which is occupied by the Tower of Homage, the castle's keep which housed the lord's chambers and kitchens. Two floors are within, connected via a spiral staircase to the castle's upper terrace and broad views over the surrounding countryside. The castle is thought to have been capable of accommodating as many as 500 people.

The castle is privately owned; its two main towers have been substantially restored. Its exterior is freely visible, but visits to its interior require the permission of the owners, the family of Antonio Sanz Polo of Molina de Aragón. It is some way from the nearest paved road but can be reached on foot in a day-long hike or in a sufficiently rugged motor vehicle via a dirt road leading up from the village of Hombrados.

The entrance of the castle was once reachable via a route said to be of "great ingenuity and appearance" but this disappeared long ago. Visitors today have to reach the entrance by climbing a ladder installed by the owner. According to Antonio Herrera Casado, visitors can expect to be "surprised at the beauty of the scene, the ferocity of the rocks and walls, the battlements, and especially the valiant towers visible to the astonished audience."

== History ==
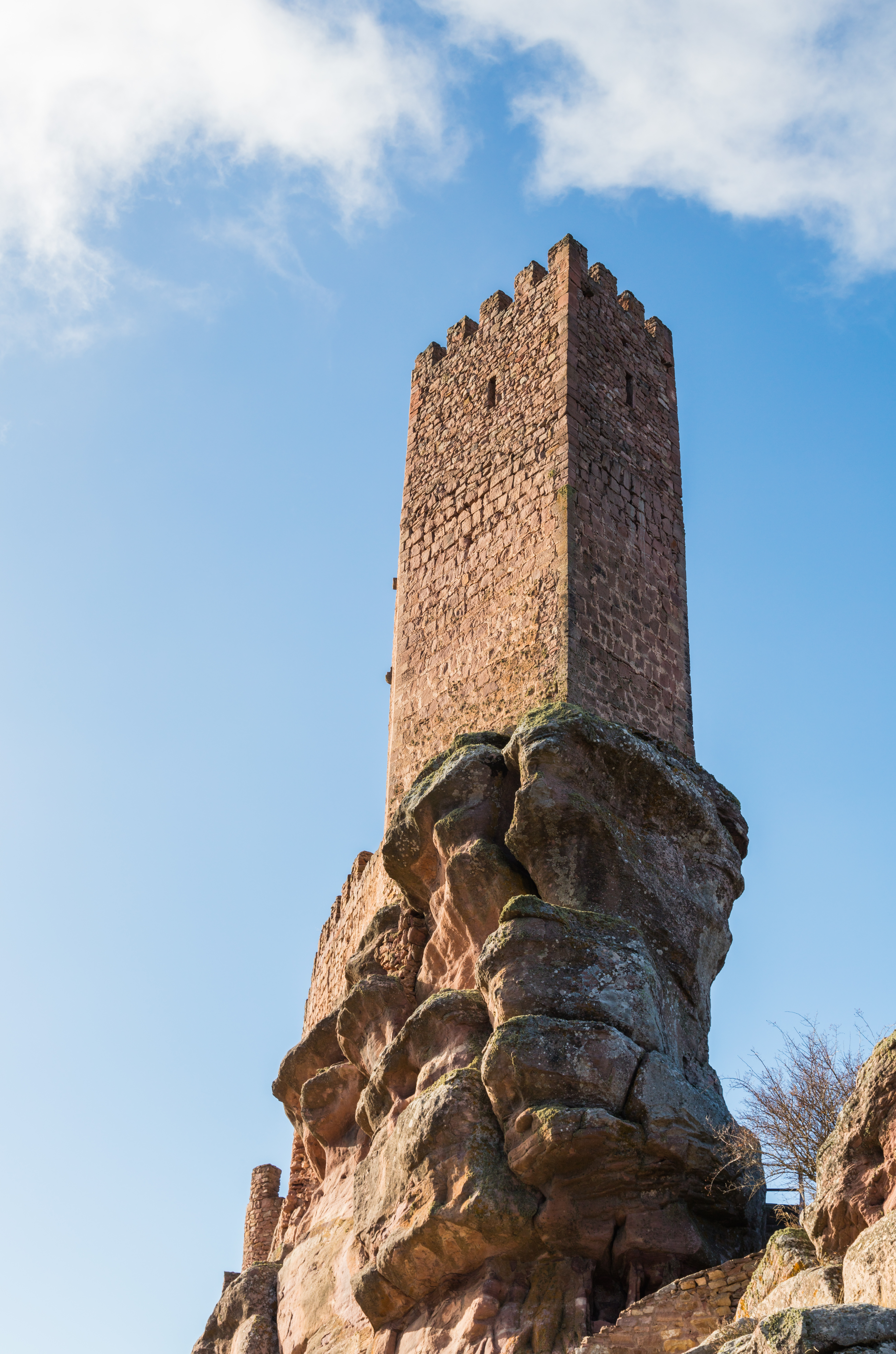
One of the castle's towers

The Castle of Zafra and the surrounding area have a long history of habitation. Pottery fragments from the Bronze and Iron Ages have been found in rock cavities and in the vicinity of the castle. The Romans may have occupied the rock on which the castle now stands, as the remains of structures from the classical era have been found in the castle's grounds. The earliest known fortress on the site is believed to have been established by the Visigoths during the time of the Visigothic Kingdom prior to around 720. The Moors had a fortification there which was used by the Taifa of Toledo.

The Moorish fortress changed hands in 1129 when the Christian kingdoms of the north reconquered Zafra as part of the Reconquista of the Iberian Peninsula. The Kingdom of Aragon took it over to serve as a key defensive position in the south of its territory, to guard the newly created community of town and land (comunidad de villa y tierra) of Daroca. It was proclaimed by the area's semi-independent ruler, Don Manrique Pérez de Lara, to be one of the most important of his dominions in the Charter of Molina de Aragón that was proclaimed in 1154.

=== 12th to 16th centuries ===
The present castle was constructed some time between the latter half of the 12th century and the first years of the 13th as the de Lara family sought to consolidate their hold on the territory of the Real Señorío de Molina. Its defences were put to the test in 1222 when Don Gonzalo Perez de Lara, the third ruler of Molina, aroused the hostility of King Fernando III of Castile. Don Gonzalo had committed a series of excesses in territories adjoining his fief, including attacks on villages held by neighbouring lords. Other Castilian lords began to raid royal territories in an apparent attempt to overthrow King Fernando and in support of King Alfonso IX of Leon. When Fernando's army marched on Molina, Don Gonzalo fled to the castle with his family, court and retainers. The royal army was unable to storm it, and after several weeks of siege the two sides negotiated a resolution. Under the Agreement of Zafra, the Señorío de Molina would be inherited on Don Gonzalo's death by his daughter Doña Mafalda, who would marry Fernando's son Prince Alfonso, thus bringing the territory under the Crown's control.

During the Castilian Civil War of the 14th century, Henry II of Castile bestowed the castle and lordship of Molina on his French mercenary ally Bertrand du Guesclin, but the people of Molina rebelled and invited Peter IV of Aragon to rule them. The castle was fought over and was eventually bestowed upon Peter's vassal Ximeno Perez de Vera. It eventually passed back to Castile by marriage, but in the 15th century Henry IV of Castile provoked another rebellion when he bestowed the castle and town on his favourite Beltrán de la Cueva. Its castellan, the famous Don Juan de Hombrados Malo, managed to see off all opponents and maintained the crown's control of the castle until it finally passed into the hands of the Catholic Monarchs of the unified kingdoms of Castile and Aragon in 1479. Don Juan was rewarded with the hereditary wardenship of the castle, which his family retained for many years thereafter. The reconquest of the Iberian peninsula and the merger of the two kingdoms deprived the castle of its former strategic importance, and from the 16th century onwards it began to fall into ruin.

=== Modern period ===
The castle remained the property of the Spanish state until 1971, when it was sold at auction for 30,000 Spanish pesetas. Its purchaser was Don Antonio Sanz Polo (1913–2008), a descendant of Don Juan de Hombrados Malo and a distinguished educator. His family had kept Don Juan's documents of wardenship for over 400 years, passing them down the generations. By this time the castle was completely ruined. Sanz Polo spent the next 30 years and most of his fortune on rebuilding the castle, hiring cranes, architects and historians to assist him. He was recognised for his efforts by the award of the Medal of Merit from the National Association of Friends of Castles.

== Filming location ==
HBO filmed outdoor scenes for season 6 of its fantasy television series Game of Thrones at the castle. According to its present owner, Daniel Antonio Sanz, the producers were "looking for a remote site and away from any building". The castle stands in for the Tower of Joy in three episodes of the season, "Oathbreaker", "Blood of My Blood" and "The Winds of Winter", during flashback scenes that reveal a secret from Ned Stark's past.
