= Piedra River =

Piedra River may refer to:

- Piedra River (Colorado), a tributary of the San Juan River
- Piedra River, Spain, a tributary of the river Jalón
