= Campillo de Dueñas =

Place in Guadalajara, Spain

Campillo de Dueñas, Spain
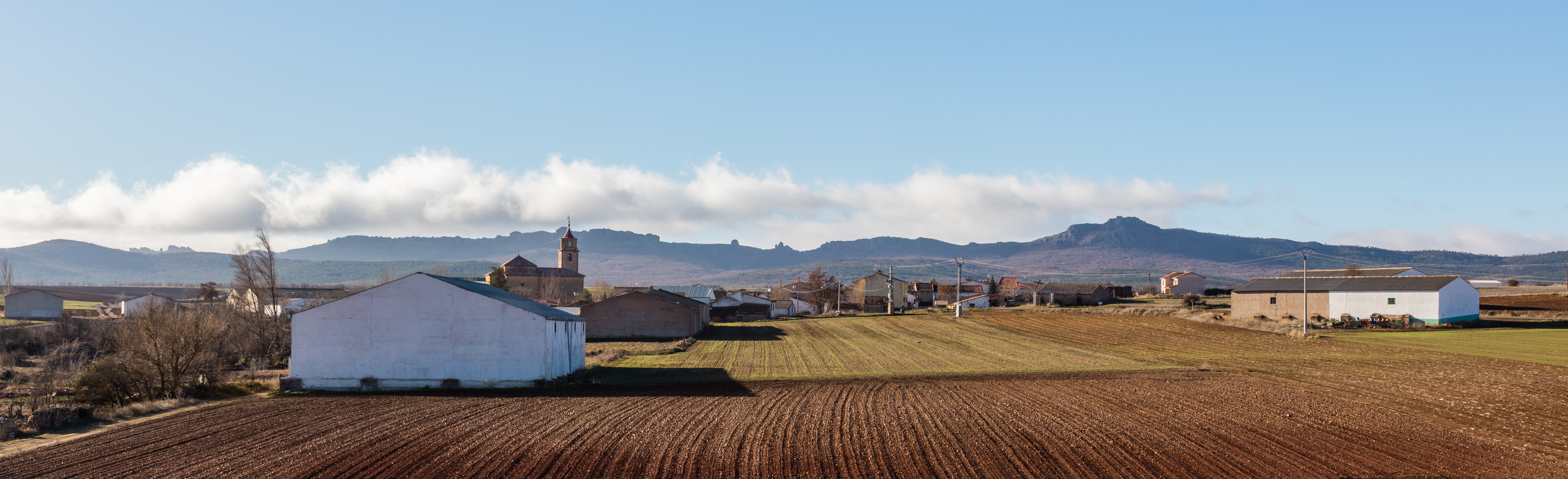

- Location within Province of Guadalajara Location within Castilla-La Mancha Location within Spain
- Country: Spain
- Autonomous community: Castile-La Mancha
- Province: Guadalajara
- Municipality: Campillo de Dueñas

Area
  - Total: 60 km^{2} (23 sq mi)

Population (2025-01-01)
  - Total: 71
  - Density: 1.2/km^{2} (3.1/sq mi)
- Time zone: UTC+1 (CET)
  - Summer (DST): UTC+2 (CEST)

Campillo de Dueñas is a municipality located in the province of Guadalajara, Castile-La Mancha, Spain, near the source of the river Piedra. According to the 2004 census (INE), the municipality has a population of 111 inhabitants.

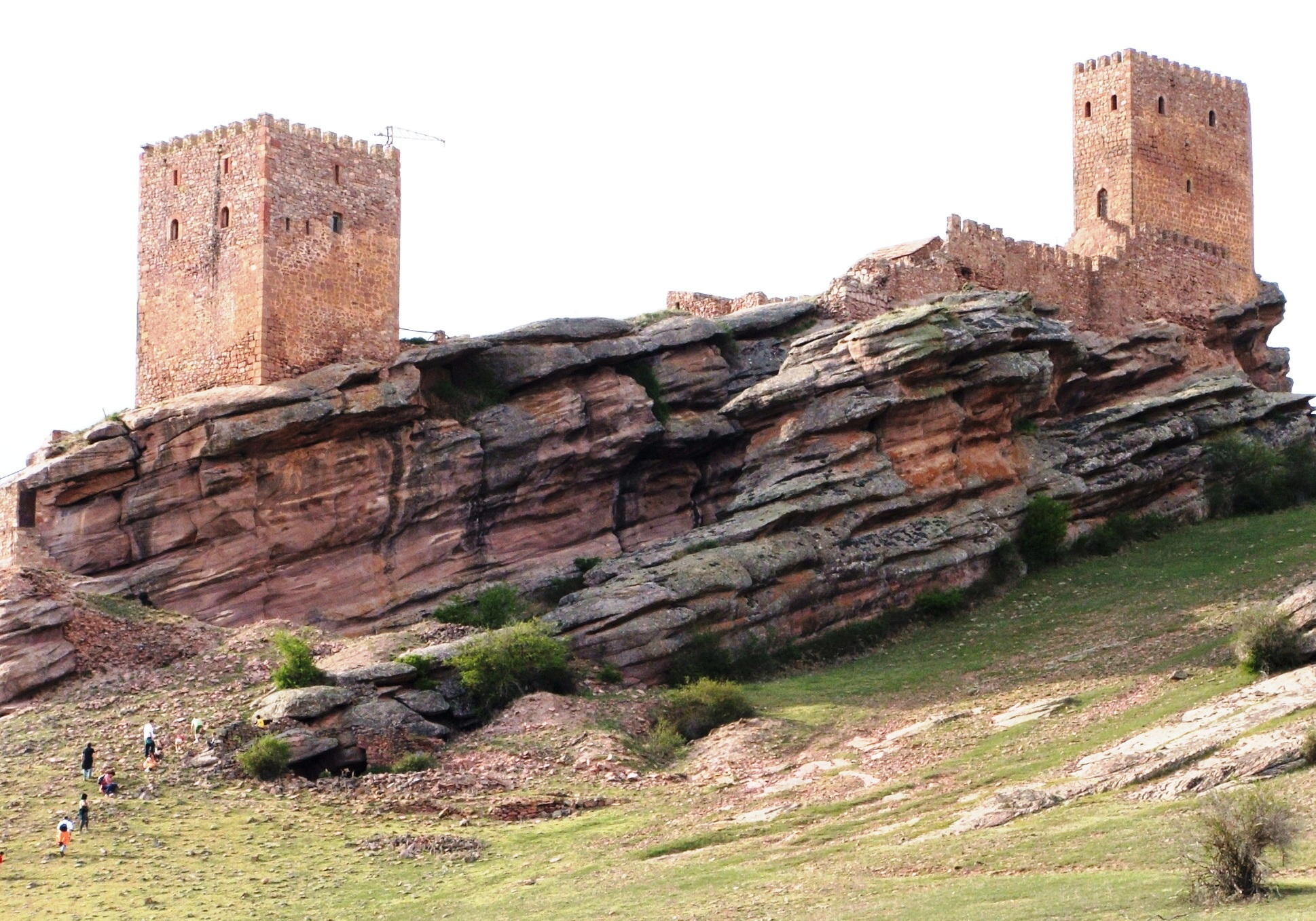
Castle of Zafra in Campillo de Dueñas.
