= Castejón de las Armas =

Municipality in Zaragoza, Aragon, Spain

Castejón de las Armas, Spain
- Flag Coat of arms

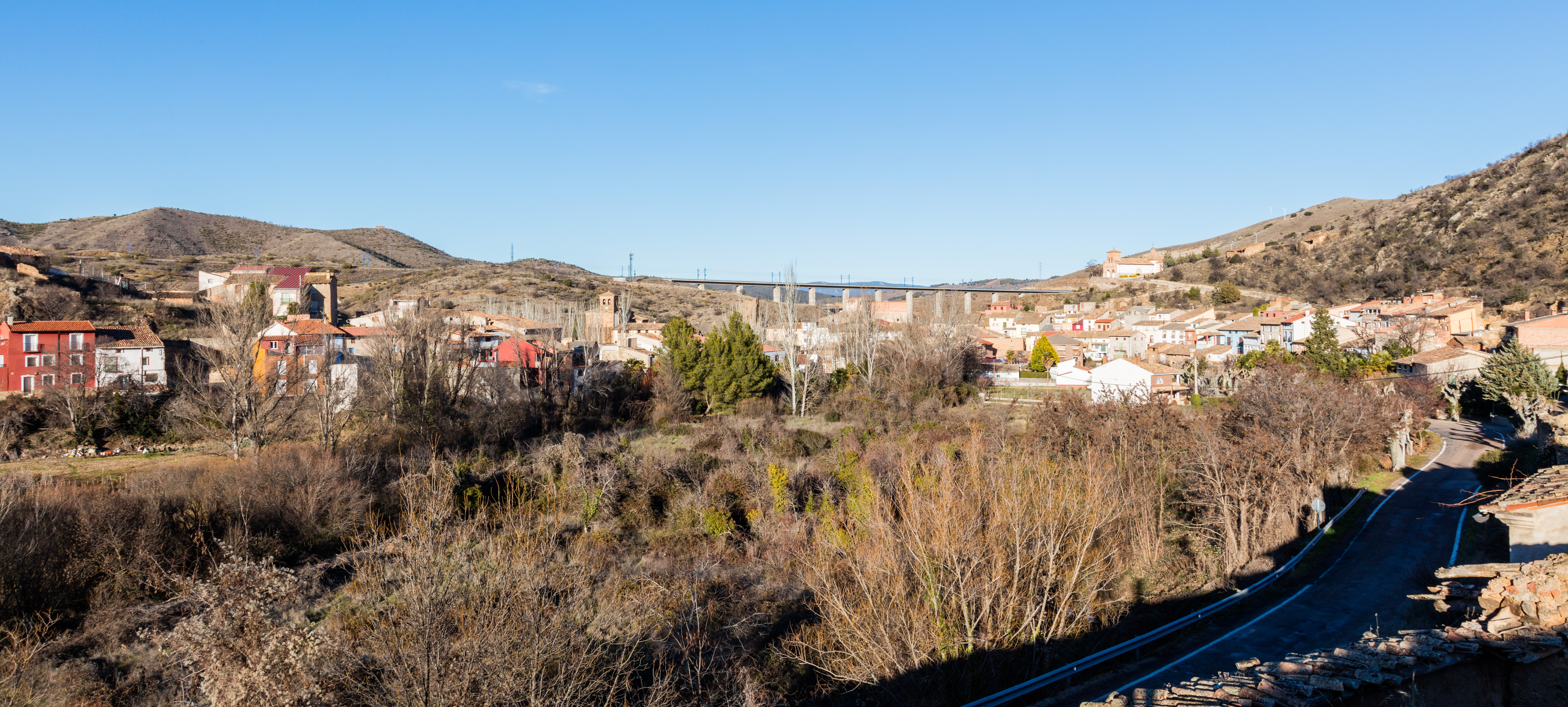

- Location within Aragon Location within Spain Location within Europe
- Country: Spain
- Autonomous community: Aragon
- Province: Zaragoza
- Municipality: Castejón de las Armas

Area
  - Total: 16 km^{2} (6.2 sq mi)

Population (2025-01-01)
  - Total: 87
  - Density: 5.4/km^{2} (14/sq mi)
- Time zone: UTC+1 (CET)
  - Summer (DST): UTC+2 (CEST)

Castejón de las Armas is a municipality located in the province of Zaragoza, Aragon, Spain. The River Piedra joins the Jalón here. According to the 2004 census (INE), the municipality has a population of 99 inhabitants.

== See also ==
- List of municipalities in Zaragoza
