= Monasterio de Piedra =

Monastery in Aragon, Spain

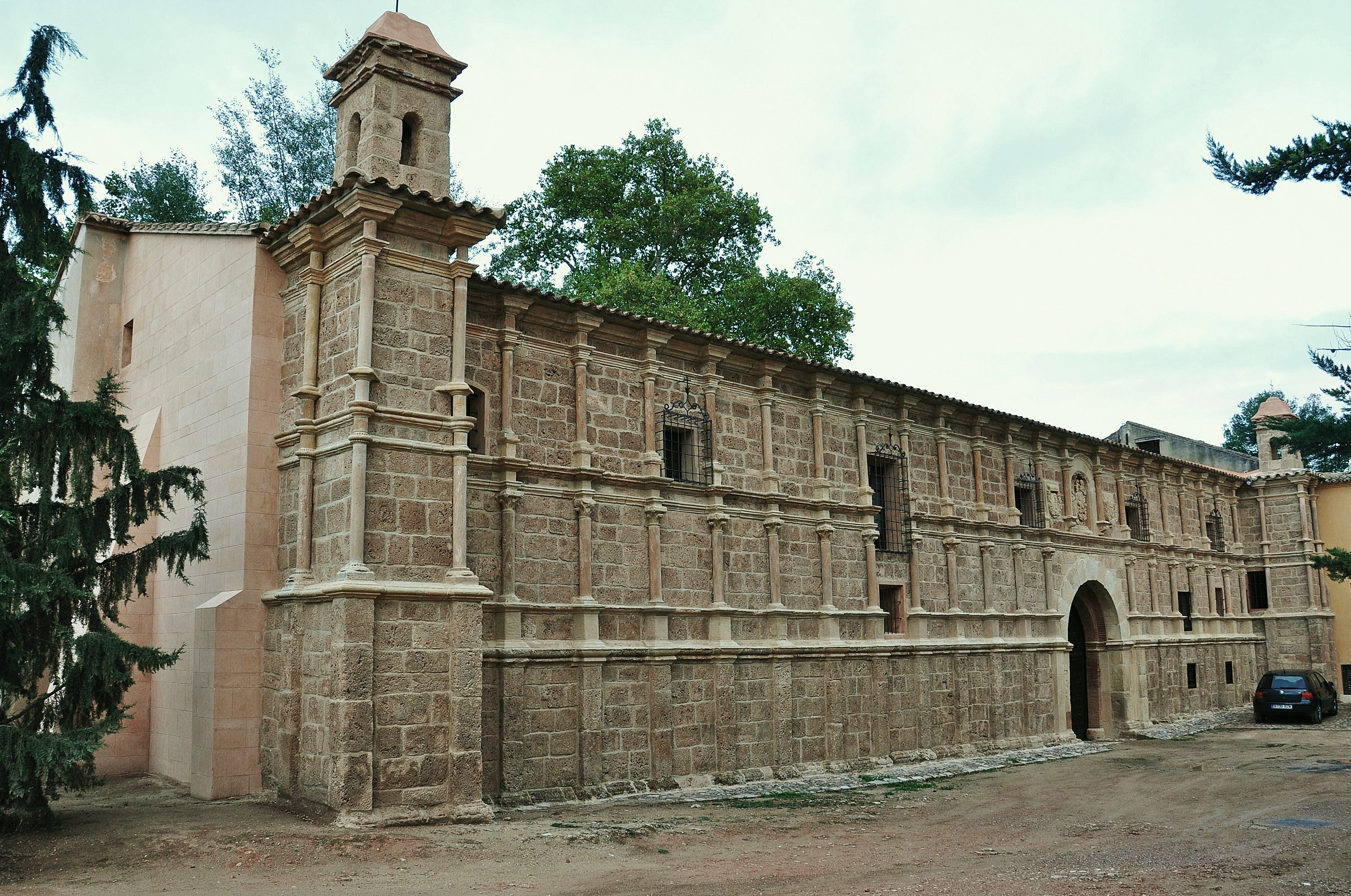

Religion
- Affiliation: Cistercians
- Province: Zaragoza
- Year consecrated: 1218

Location
- Location: Nuévalos, Spain
- Interactive map of Monasterio de Piedra
- Coordinates: 41°11′35.81″N 1°46′57.34″W

Architecture
- Style: Gothic and Baroque
- Completed: 12th–18th centuries

Monasterio de Piedra (Stone Monastery) is a monastery, hotel and park complex in the Iberian System mountain ranges, near Nuévalos, province of Zaragoza, Aragon, Spain. The monastery was founded in 1194 by Alfonso II of Aragon, with thirteen Cistercian monks from Poblet Monastery, in an old castle next to the Piedra River, and was dedicated to St. Mary the White (Santa María la Blanca). On 16 February 1983, the entire complex was declared a national monument.

== History ==
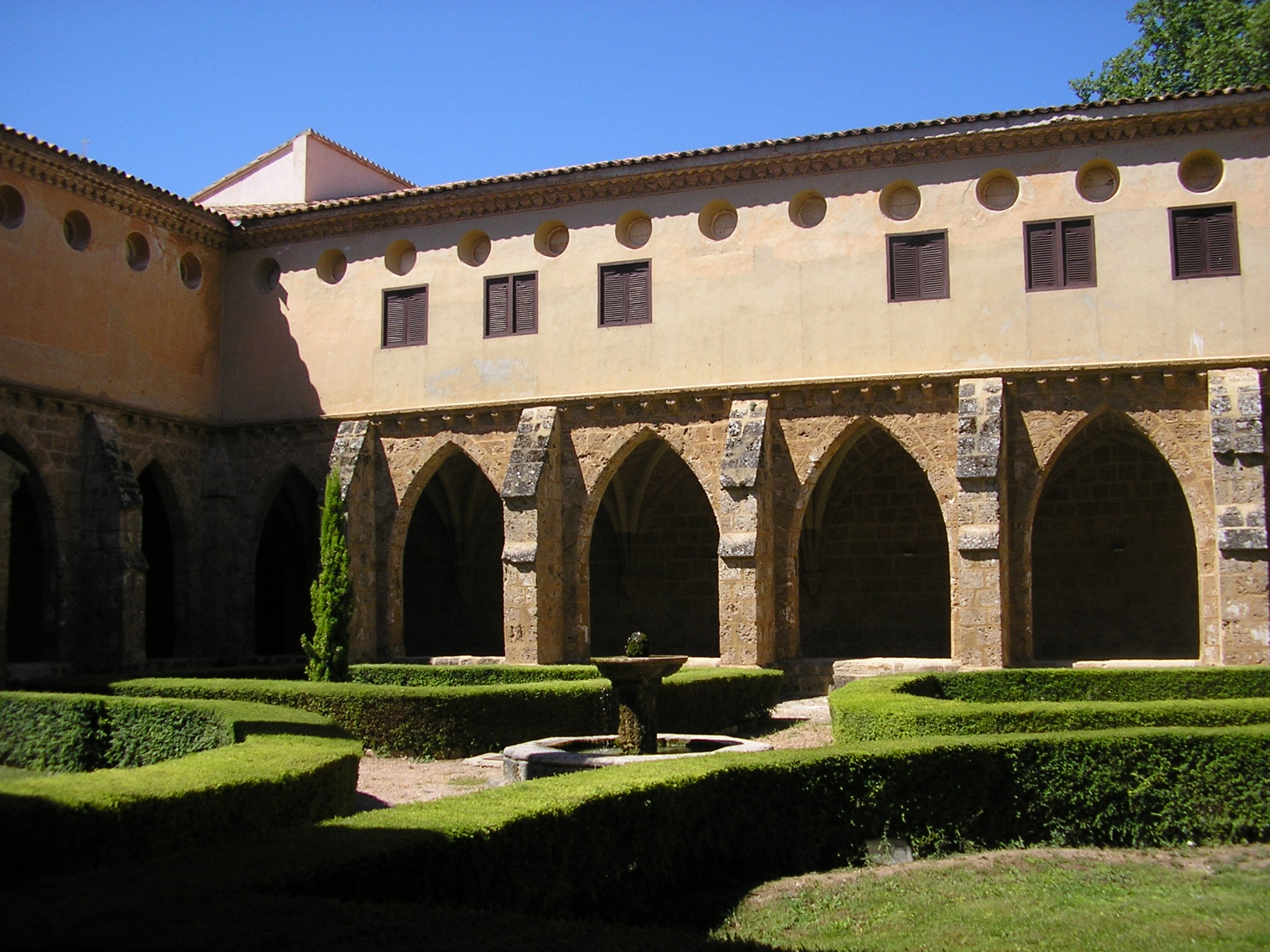
Cloister of the Monasterio de Piedra

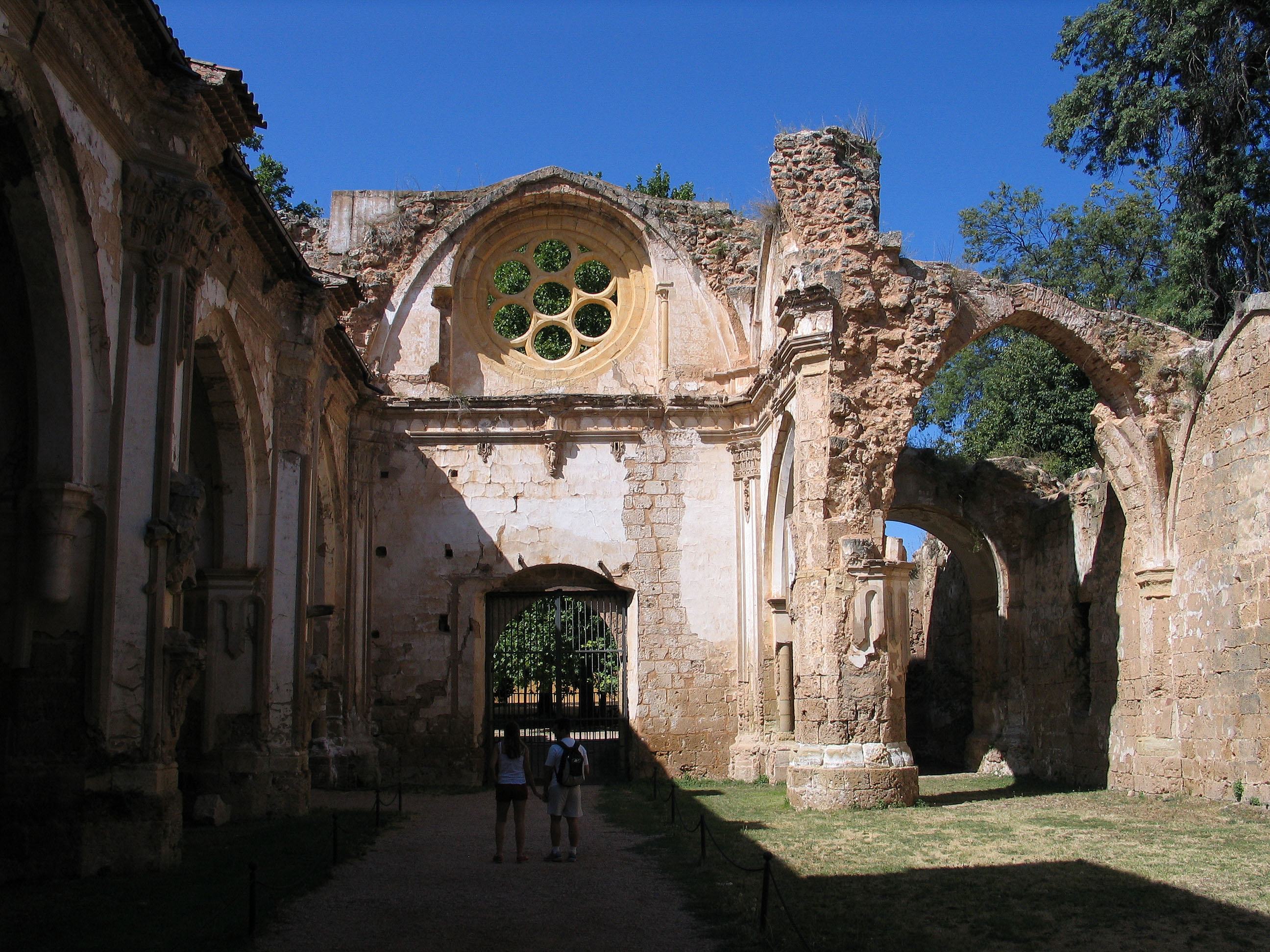
Ruins of the monastery's main church

Ruins of the church

The Monasterio de Nuestra Señora de Piedra (Monastery of our Lady of Stone) is located besides the Piedra (Stone) River, in one of the most barren areas of Spain. Its origins date back to 1194, when Alfonso II of Aragon, and his wife Doña Sancha donated an old Moorish castle to the monks of Poblet to build a monastery and to establish the Christian faith in the area.

The Monasterio de Piedra is in a mountainous region, at around 736 m above sea level in the Iberian System. The traditional access road to the monastery follows the Piedra River, starting from the Nuevalos village. Along the old path are the masonry ruins of a watermill or wheel. This beautiful spot is often used by the Cistercians as inspiration for their work and prayer. The Monasterio de Piedra was founded by Alfonso II in 1194 with monks from Poblet. The work started in 1195 and was completed in 1219.

The monastery lies in the confluence of the Ortiz and Piedra Rivers, in a land of thermal springs, such as Alhama and Jaraba. Islamic invaders sought to establish their cities on the rivers banks because their economy was based on agriculture, which was performed through laboring irrigated lands. This is why they chose to live on low lands and did not effectively occupy the higher areas of the Pyrenees, where they merely controlled the traffic of people and goods through fortified steps at the entrance of the valleys. This is also the reason why the noble and Christian clergy, who would be the most likely to suffer because of the arrival of Islam, had to settle on the northern regions of the Iberian Peninsula, where they began to set up churches and monasteries that would sustain those early Christian communities.

The monastery was constructed for defensive strength, with a web of minor fortresses, in an area heavily populated by Muslims. Since the Muslim era, there were abundant irrigation systems, canals, ditches and castles. In 1201, Pope Innocent III issued a papal bull for D. Arnold, successor to the first abbot, confirming possession of property owned by the monastery on its own terms. In 1212 Pope Innocent III issued a papal bull confirming all former possessions. During the reign of Pedro IV the differences between monks and residents in 1335 caused the king to receive the Stone Monastery with their vassals under his tutelage. Subsequently, the pontiffs were granted protection. The monks made several altercations, among which were the passage of merchant caravans of mules, the exploitation of the salt in the municipality of Nuevalos, water use in the villages of the region, dominion over the villages, tithe, etc.

Excerpts from the Archivo Historico Nacional in Spain in the Aragonese language correspond to a sentence of the second half of the 13th century (between 1260 and 1265). We can see among other things: the origin of the term "pieça", (piece, part), which currently holds in Llumes village to designate the farms, but is lost in the rest of Aragon; the references to localities are under its current names except for Calatayud which appears as "Calataiub". The village now called Llumes is named "Flumes" from Flumen, or "river" in Latin. The municipalities correspond with the current ones, the limit between Monterde and Llumes is still the road from Cubel to the Monastery, which is the current limit of the Parish of San Miguel.

One had to cross the medieval keep to gain entrance through the walls The church opened into the cloister, noted for its great arches, and the various premises of the monastery. The chapter house (from the early 12th century) was the vital center of monastic life; the monks resided in the main building built in the 17th century. The Romanesque columns of the former abbot's residence support the current Neoclassical one, constructed in the 18th century. In front of the keep are several ancient stones lambing enclosures transformed into hotel rooms, with their corrals landscaped.

The monastery was closed down in 1835 during Isabella II of Spain's rule due to the Ecclesiastical Confiscations of Mendizábal. The Desamortización, or secularization, of the place brought monastic life to an end and the main church was destroyed. The main building has been converted today into a quiet hotel.

In February 1836, the Mendizabal Confiscation Ecclesiastical Act declared the sale of all property belonging to the regular clergy, and the proceeds were intended to amortize the debt. The decree was part of a program that sought to win the Carlist Civil War to raise funds and troops to restore confidence in the credit of the State and in the long term, allow for tax reform. Mendizabal, in the preamble, set out other basic objectives of the seizure: clean up the Hacienda and reduce debt, get access to the property of bourgeois sectors, which would improve production and revalue, and create a new social sector related to the system owners and to the side of Queen Cristina.

Since it was abandoned in 1840, Pablo Muntadas Campeny, a Catalan wealthy merchant, bought the monastery, maintaining farming and livestock in the place. He was surprised by the cool environment in this dry remote rural area.

His son, Juan Federico Muntadas, shaped the park by making changes to paths and walkways and planting. Closest to the circuit of the 19th-century Spanish spas, and aware of the responsibility of conserving the landscape and the precarious state of the monastery, Campeny bought the abandoned monastery and its surroundings, and tried several viable businesses. These include a spa, a hotel and a salmon farm. In 1860, after discovering the Iris cave, it was opened to the public. In 1867, he created the first fish farm in Spain, and naturalized brown trout and Iberian crayfish in the waters of the Piedra River. Subsequently, in 1886, the Fisheries Centre of the Monasterio de Piedra was ceded to the Spanish Government. The center continues today to have rivers full of species for reforestation. The result of these activities is the garden that we know today was declared "Paraje Pintoresco Nacional" in 1940.

Don Juan Federico Muntadas, founder and architect of the park, naturalized several salmonid species in the Piedra River. He explored the existing caves, cleaned and opened a path, and brought beautiful tree species, bearing a spa to the condition and use of medicinal waters spas of the era.

The church has three naves and its transept is very spoiled, especially the vaults, which fell completely following the abandonment bound by the confiscation. The Monasterio de Piedra is accessed by a medieval wall that stands as the medieval watchtower. The monastery's construction progressed in three architectural stages: Gothic (13th century), Renaissance Gothic (16th century) and Classical-Baroque (18th century).

The five apses with the semicircular central are important parts of the head. The western gate is well preserved, despite the shabby facade. It has the looks of a late Romanesque style, with pointed arches and teeth of a saw, much like other Cistercian monasteries.

The faculty has vaults and arches of great simplicity. The Chapter of the Monasterio de Piedra was restored and returned its original likeness. The vaults are ribbed pillars with multiple columns in the center (with traces of original paint) and supports the walls in the form of brackets. It is also has a dramatic faculty room with double lancet arches and pointed eyepiece multitude of elegant columns with vegetable-based "crochets." Other preserved units that one should not fail to see are the monks kitchen, the refectory and the Cilla.

== Park ==
The monastery is located near the Piedra River Canyon, home to many species of birds, damselflies, trout, and endangered fish like the South-west European nase and an endangered species of barbel. The canyon itself includes a network of mossy, garden-like caves (natural and man-made), waterfalls and lagoons that contrast with the otherwise dry hills of southern Aragon. The tallest waterfall is "Horsetail" (Cola del Caballo), more than fifty meters high. The dissolution and precipitation of local limestone has created numerous rivulets, springs, and Karst topography. The Piedra River meanders around a mountain known as "El Espolón" (The Ram). In 1959, a dam was constructed across the river, which created the 1300 acre La Tranquera Reservoir, flooding part of the canyon, some of the best local farmland, and several villages. The roofs of some drowned houses can still be seen when the water levels are down. The reservoir provides domestic water supply, irrigation and electrical energy. The region is a popular tourist destination for hiking, camping, and water sports.

The Lago del Espejo (Mirror Lake) in Monasterio de Piedra's park.

The Rio Piedra in the park

One of the many divided waterfalls in the park.

Another view of the park.

A cave under one of the park's waterfalls.

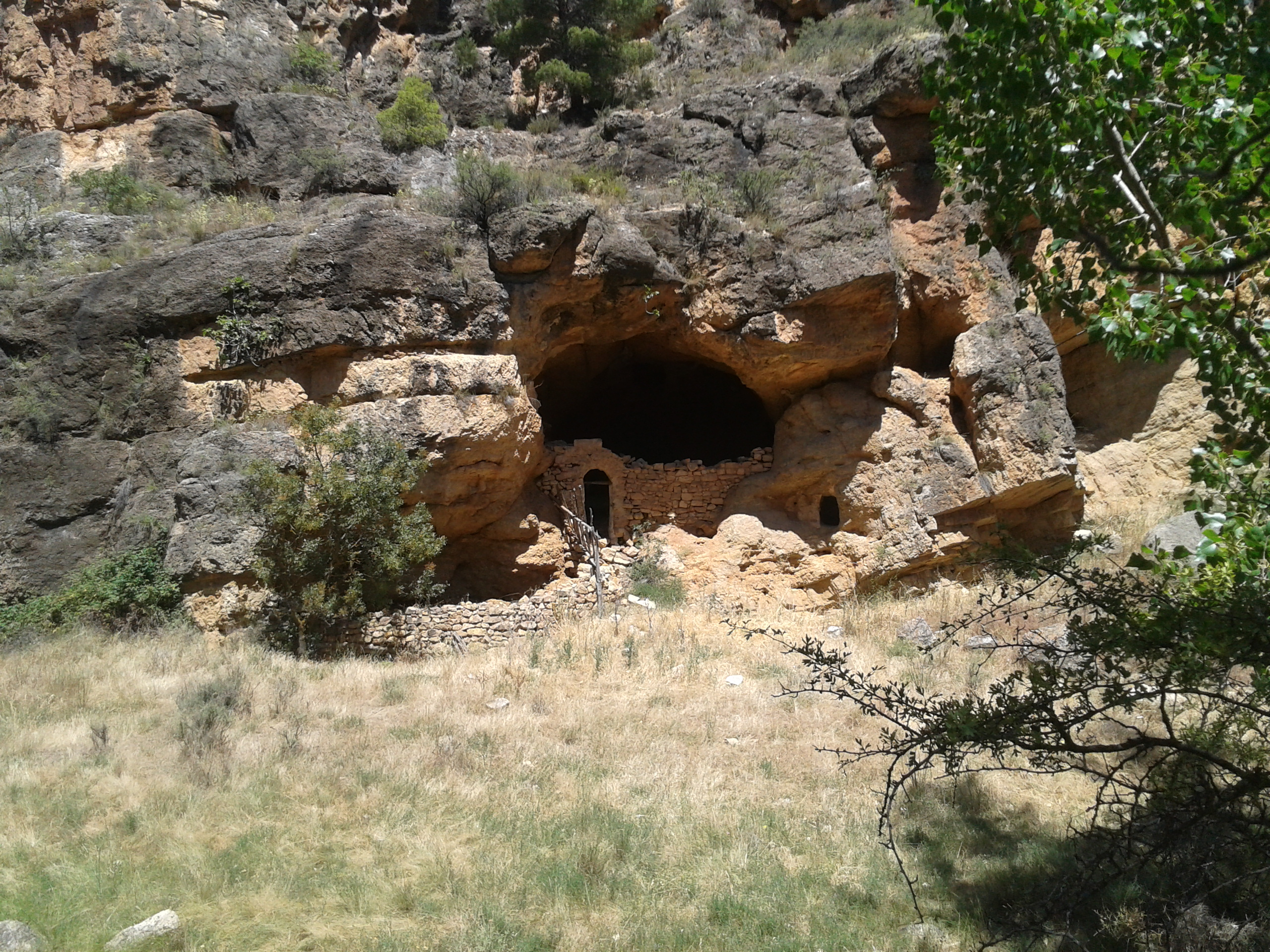
Paridera in a natural cave near to the park.

The native flora of the area includes oak, pine, holm and kermes oak, interspersed with meadows of lavender (Lavandula stoechas). There are cultivated almond trees, grape vines, and cherry trees. At elevations above 800 meters, the scrub oaks give way to forest vegetation, including maritime and Corsican pines, which have been cultivated throughout the 20th century. At lower elevations, there are also cultivated Aleppo pine (Pinus halepensis), walnut, horse chestnut, ash, maple, laurel, and cypress trees. Near the water there is a diverse flora, including willows, belfry, reeds (Phragmites australis, Typha angustifoli, Juncus articulatus, Juncus inflexus), grasses (Imperata cylindrica), yellow iris, poplar, tamarisk, plum feral, cherry feral, elms, vines (Clematis vitalba, Vitis vinifera, and ivy), wild roses, wild broom (Osyris alba), dewberries and blackberries.

Many mammals live in the park, including foxes, beech marten, wild boars, rabbits, deer, badgers and genets, though not in large numbers. Bird species include colonies of vultures, golden eagles, peregrine falcons, hawks, kestrels, owls - especially Scops owls, partridges, quail, doves, larks, robins, and finches. Several European thrush species and the barbary dove are numerous enough to influence the dispersal of plants like Celtis australis, Cynanchum acutum, and bittersweet nightshade. The Tranquera Reservoir and Gallocanta Lagoon create marsh land, which are home to mallards, ducks, pochard, coots, teal, herons and cormorants. Frogs, painted frog, newts, lizards, and various kinds of snakes can be found here as well. The most common fish are trout, catfish and nase, and some areas are stocked with carp and rainbow trout. Local invertebrates include the crayfish Procambarus clarkii, tarantulas and other spiders, butterflies, Brachycera flies, damselflies and dragonflies.

== See also ==
- List of Bienes de Interés Cultural in the Province of Zaragoza
