= Piedra (Spain) =

River in Spain

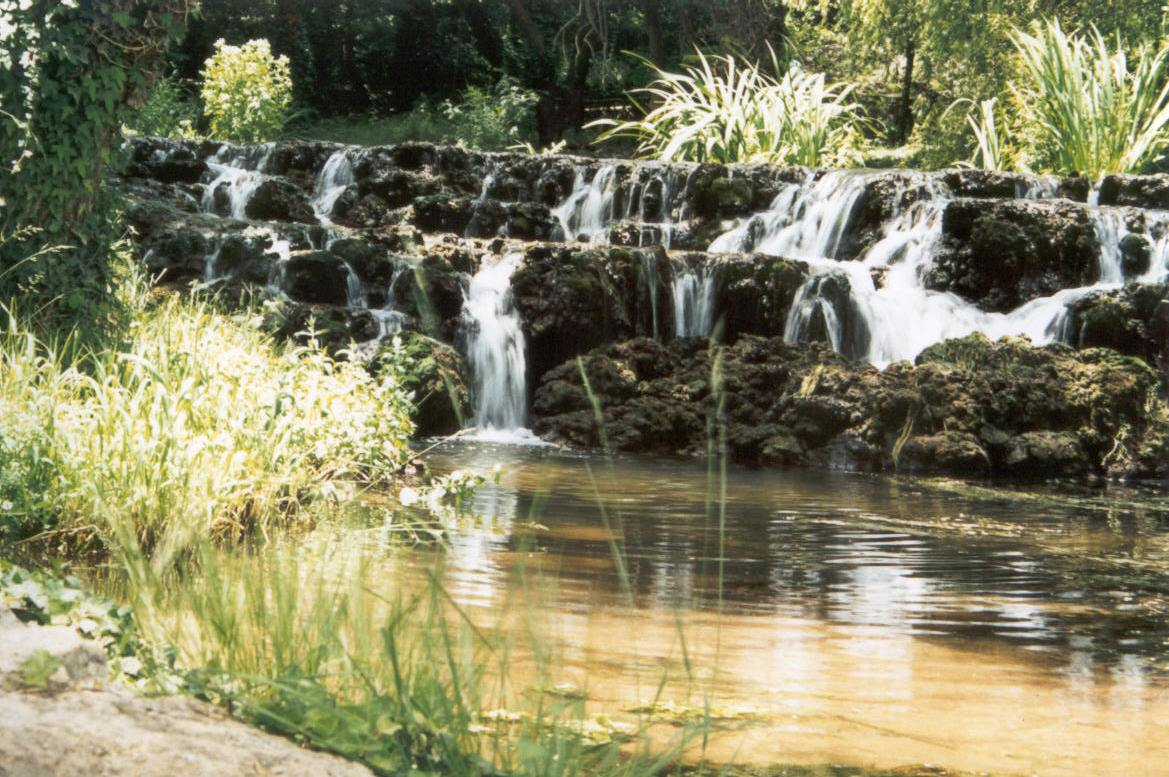
- The Piedra flowing through the Monasterio de Piedra area

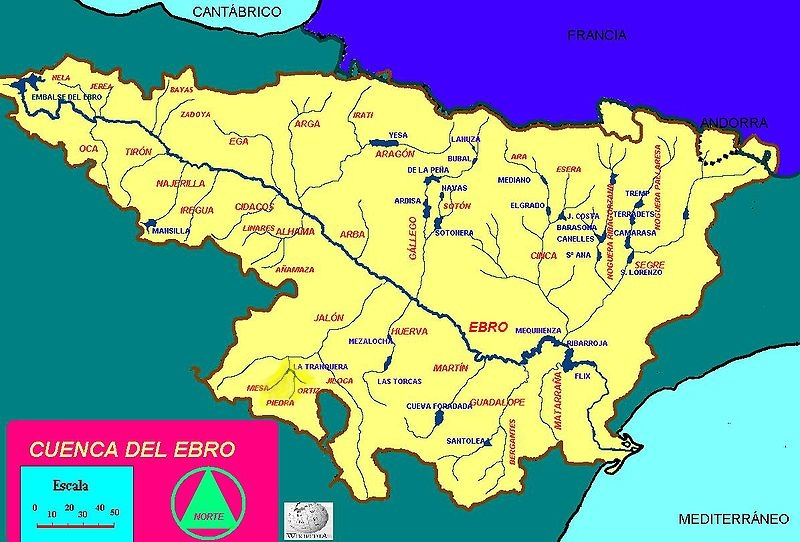
- The watershed of the Piedra within the Ebro basin.
- Native name: Río Piedra (Spanish)

Location
- Country: Spain
- Region: Castile-La Mancha, Aragón
- District: province of Guadalajara, province of Zaragoza
- City: Campillo de Dueñas, Cimballa, Nuévalos, Carenas, Castejón de las Armas

Physical characteristics
- Source: Campillo de Dueñas
  - location: province of Guadalajara, Castile-La Mancha, Spain
  - coordinates: 40.833°N 1.655°W
  - elevation: 1,195 m (3,921 ft)
- Mouth: Castejón de las Armas
  - location: province of Zaragoza, Aragón, Spain
  - coordinates: 41.319°N 1.810°W
  - elevation: 590 m (1,940 ft)
- Length: 76 km (47 mi)
- Discharge
  - average: 1.22 m^{3}/s (43 cu ft/s)

Basin features
- Progression: Jalón→ Ebro→ Balearic Sea
- Tributaries
  - left: Mesa River
  - right: Ortiz, Munebraga
- River system: Ebro

The Piedra (Spanish: Río Piedra) is a river in the Iberian System area, Spain. It is a tributary of the river Jalón. The waters have a high concentration of calcium carbonate which is deposited on plant life near the source, giving the river its name Río Piedra, which means 'stone river' in English.

The population of the endangered European freshwater crayfish in the river and its tributaries has practically disappeared owing to the introduction of the North American signal crayfish (Pacifastacus leniusculus).

== Geography ==
It rises near Campillo de Dueñas, in the province of Guadalajara, Castile-La Mancha. The Piedra has an irregular flow, due to the long sunny season of the summer months, with often heavy rainfall in the spring and autumn. The mean discharge at Monasterio de Piedra is 1.22 cubic metres per second (43 cu ft/s).

The river is often said to rise at Cimballa, in the province of Zaragoza, but it actually rises near Campillo de Dueñas, although the upper reaches are often dry in the summer months. Springs at Campillo amplify the flow, so that it always has water below this point.

From Cimballa, the Piedra flows down to the water gardens of the Monasterio de Piedra where the calcareous water has formed a Karst topography of waterfalls and rocky pools. The place is popular with visitors, for it is a kind of oasis in the surrounding arid and harsh mountainous landscape. After leaving the Monasterio the river descends to La Tranquera Dam at Nuévalos. The rivers Mesa, Ortiz and Munebraga also feed the reservoir and may be considered tributaries of the Piedra. From La Tranquera, the river flows past Carenas and joins the Jalón near Castejón de las Armas and Ateca.

== Pisciculture ==
In 1988, the Government of Aragón established a fish reserve at Monasterio in order to provide fish for replenishing the stocks of Aragón's rivers.

== See also ==
- List of rivers of Spain
- Monasterio de Piedra
