= Ariza, Zaragoza =

Ariza
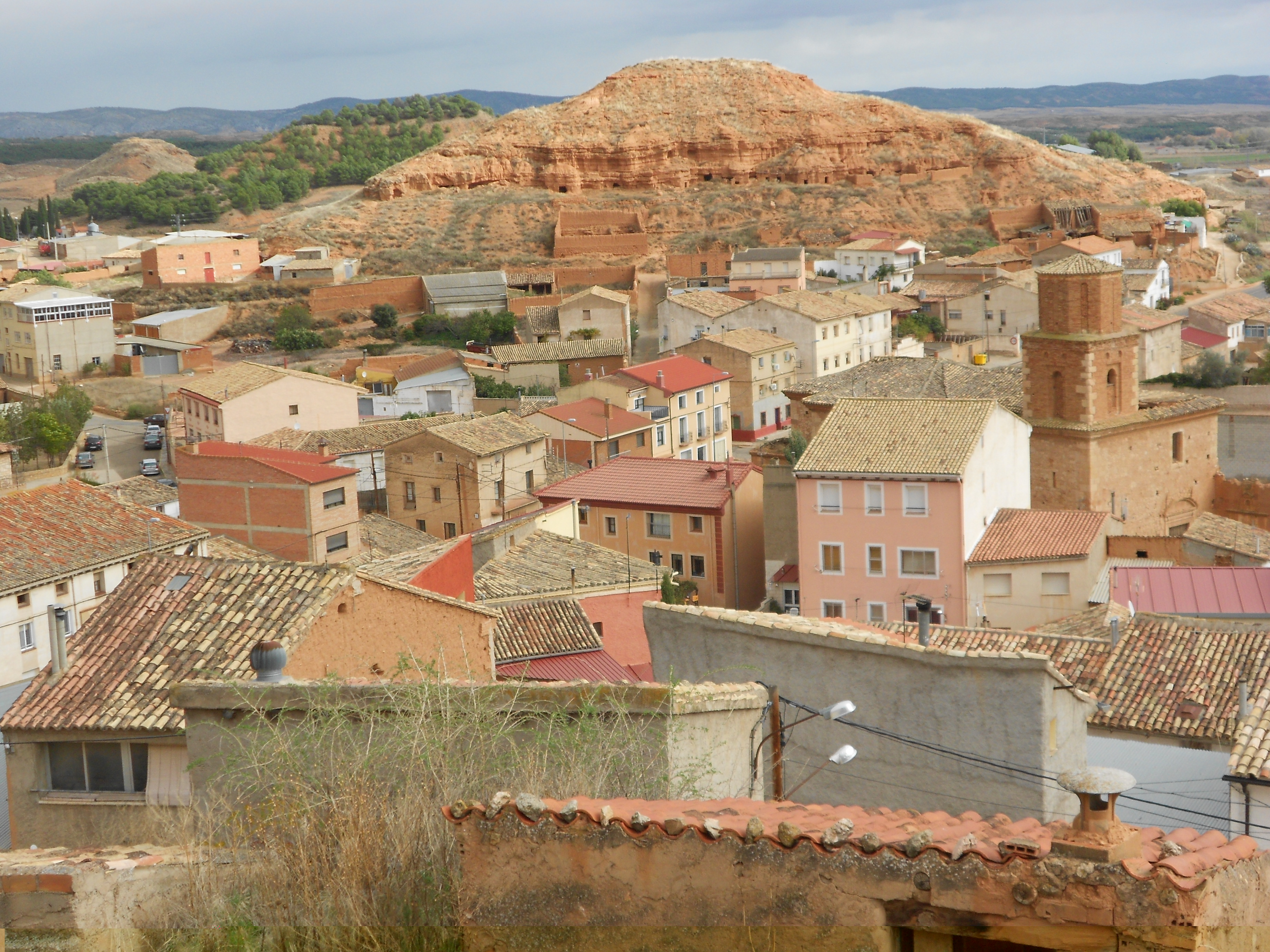

- Flag Coat of arms

- Location within Aragon Location within Spain Location within Europe
- Coordinates: 41°18′47″N 2°3′8″W
- Country: Spain
- Autonomous community: Aragon
- Province: Zaragoza
- Comarca: Comunidad de Calatayud

Government
  - Mayor: José Carlos Tirado Ballano

Area
  - Total: 103 km^{2} (40 sq mi)
- Elevation: 763 m (2,503 ft)

Population (2025-01-01)
  - Total: 1,096
  - Density: 10.6/km^{2} (27.6/sq mi)
- Time zone: UTC+1 (CET)
  - Summer (DST): UTC+2 (CEST)
- Website: Official website

Ariza is a municipality in the province of Zaragoza, Aragon, Spain. It is located in the Almazán basin, near the western boundary of Aragon, 142 km from Zaragoza.

Ariza is located 763 metres above sea level on the left bank of the Jalón river, is the city gate of Castile, which was long in dispute between Castile and Aragon.

The population is 1267 inhabitants, although it increases in summer and holidays due to tourism.

== See also ==
- List of municipalities in Zaragoza
