= Nuévalos =

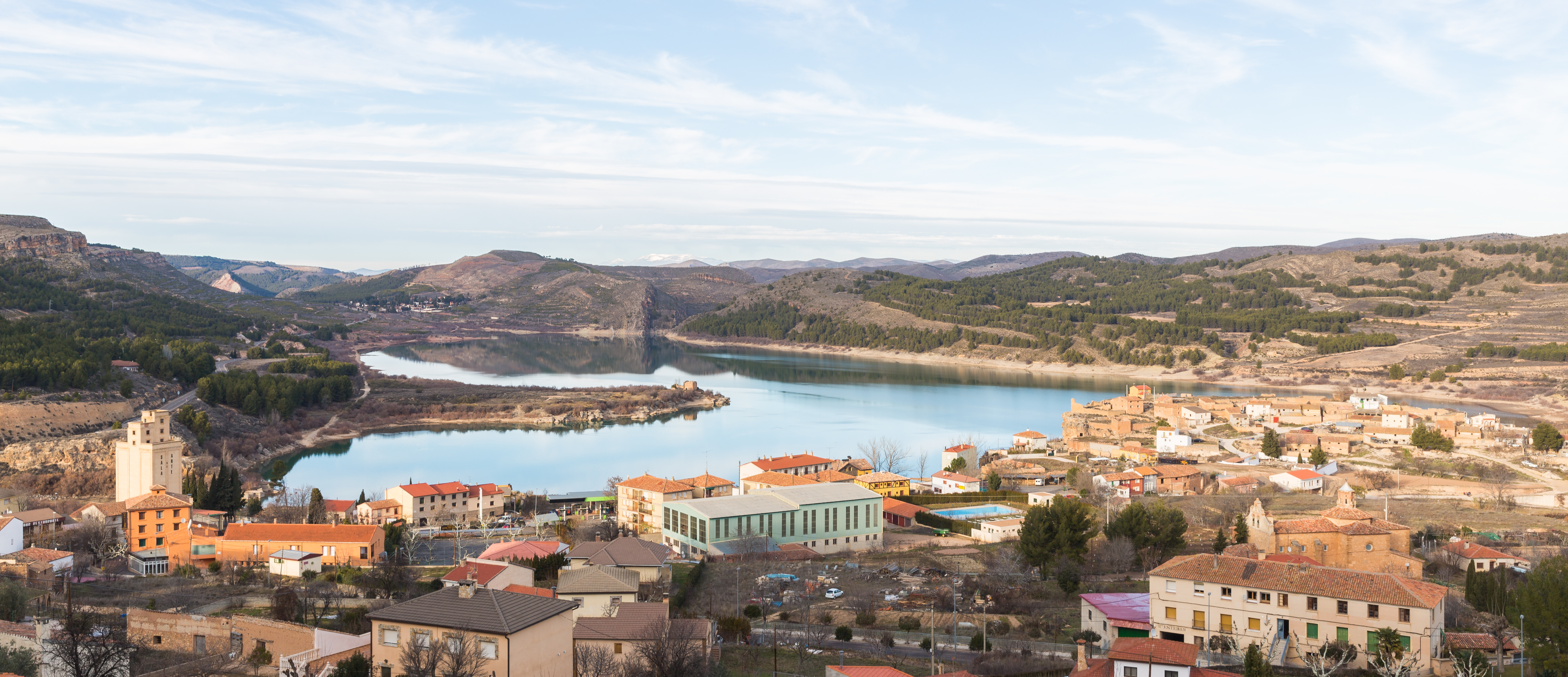
- General view of Nuévalos, in the province of Zaragoza, Spain, from La Tranquera Dam on the river Piedra

- Flag Coat of arms

- Location within Aragon Location within Spain Location within Europe
- Country: Spain
- Autonomous community: Aragon
- Province: Zaragoza
- Municipality: Nuévalos

Area
  - Total: 41 km^{2} (16 sq mi)

Population (2025-01-01)
  - Total: 318
  - Density: 7.8/km^{2} (20/sq mi)
- Time zone: UTC+1 (CET)
  - Summer (DST): UTC+2 (CEST)

Nuévalos is a municipality located in the province of Zaragoza, Aragon, Spain.

According to the 2004 census (INE), the municipality has a population of 384 inhabitants. This small town is located in the Sierra de Solorio area, 2 km down the Piedra River from the Monasterio de Piedra.

== See also ==
- List of municipalities in Zaragoza
