= Hombrados =

Hombrados, Spain
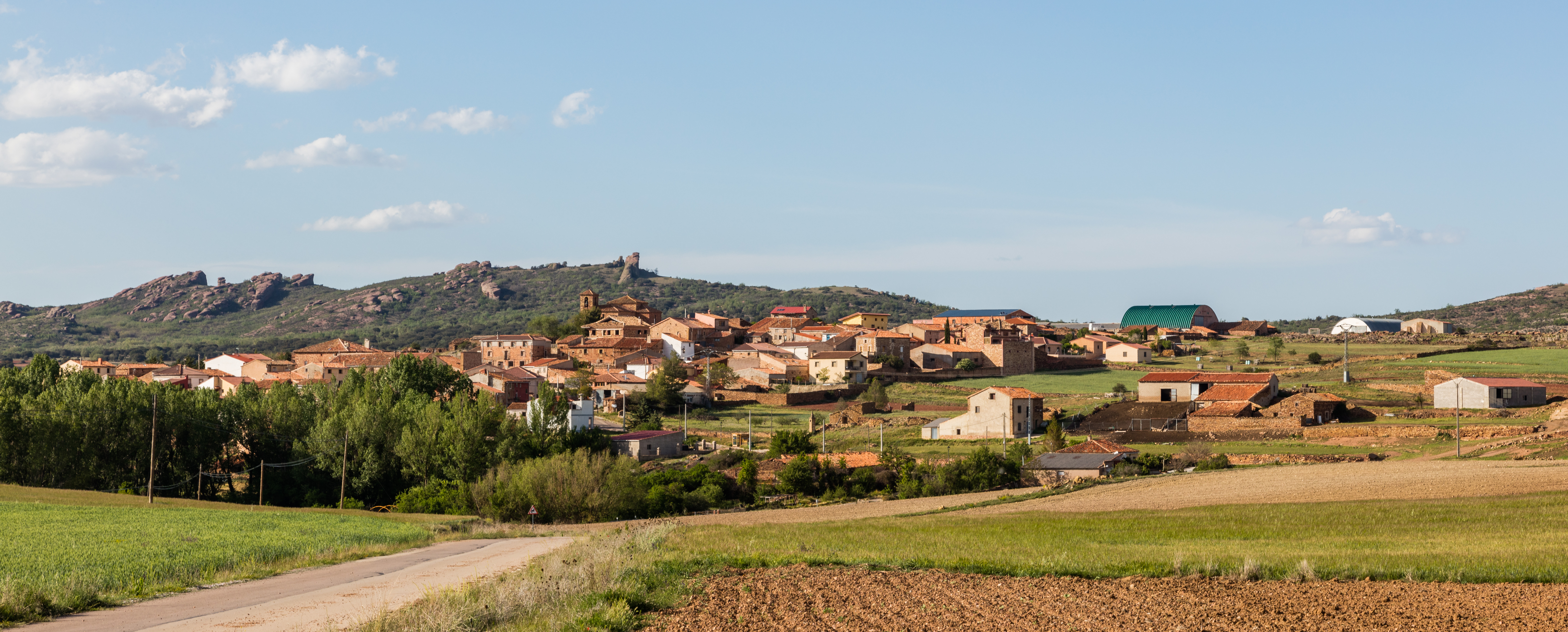

- Location within Province of Guadalajara Location within Castilla-La Mancha Location within Spain
- Country: Spain
- Autonomous community: Castile-La Mancha
- Province: Guadalajara
- Municipality: Hombrados

Area
  - Total: 38 km^{2} (15 sq mi)
- Elevation: 1,245 m (4,085 ft)

Population (2025-01-01)
  - Total: 44
  - Density: 1.2/km^{2} (3.0/sq mi)
- Time zone: UTC+1 (CET)
  - Summer (DST): UTC+2 (CEST)

Hombrados is a municipality located in the province of Guadalajara, Castile-La Mancha, Spain. According to the 2023 census (INE), the municipality has a population of 51 inhabitants.
