= Paridera =

Paridera is a Spanish word that in sheep husbandry refers to the lambing season. It also refers to buildings intended for the care of ewes and goats. In Spain, there are such buildings from the 17th through 19th centuries that have been converted into houses or hotels. Other abandoned Parideras in some areas are protected by law as refuge for animals species.

== History ==
The paridera is a traditional building in grazing areas of the ancient kingdom of Aragon, southern Soria and northern Guadalajara. The earliest reference dates from a deed of gift from the eleventh century. In it, the King of Castilla, Alfonso VI gives to the bishop of Siguenza and his descendants the village of Savin (now Torresaviñán), referring to a farrowing crate, which original document, written in Latin, called "ovetarium" and placed in the bishop's Serna.

== Architecture ==
Parideras were built, usually from rocks and rough-hewn logs, either in open areas or mountainous places, where protection from predators or the elements was beneficial to the sheep. The walls and foundations may be natural stony outcrops or natural caves.

Its use is intended to guard the sheep, both to protect them from wild animals and to save them in those moments when not grazed. They are constructed with dry stone walls, gable roof, and roof beams in poplar, pine or any log available. They consist of a corral next to the main entrance, which has a shelter or shed and an outer closed. the corral communicates with a small opening, opening to allow passage of the Lambs, one by one. Inside there is a confined space called pajar or pajera, used to store hay and grain, that preventing animals from consuming it. These facilities may be duplicated or adapted for large herds with several corrals, shelters and pajars, sometimes giving rise to its appearance resembles that of a village.

The roof is made mostly of pinewood trunks sometimes covered with fabric made from small branches of oak, pine or juniper or sometimes a fabric of woven cane plastered covers the wooden structure. It receives over an insulating bed of straw, and is intended to hold the terracotta Arab tiles.

stone wall built without mortar with intermediate gravel to better hold, with variable thickness from 60 cm. to 1 meter, depending on harsh in the geographic area, are made of slate, limestone or massive sandstone depending in the most abundant material.

The wall opposite to the door, is equipped with a small window for ventilation to dry the manure accumulated in the soil by animals. Also sometimes are longitudinal slits in the walls, ever little with a width not exceeding 15 cm., for ventilation. Its design allows cover the slits with stone and rag in the cold season.

Few parideras previous to the 17th century can be found as the roof of wood beams are not usually overlast more than 300 years without replacing, or manure and sheep's parasites accumulate over the years in large numbers are a problem and overgrazing depletes surrounding vegetation and is preferred by the shepherds to build another paridera to reform the old one. The new buildings could be in the same area (majada) separate from the former about 1 km or in another pasture area without depleting. They usually have nearby a well, natural source, stream, or pool that collects rain. Sometimes a pipeline or grooved terrain from the roof or the hillside collects the water rained down to a well or water tank.

The paridera accumulated, animal manure sold for farmers that used it to fertilize their fields. Manure is also an insulating material and because it is abundant sometimes is used as a winter fuel for heat.

Located in a natural environment wilder than now, the paridera allowed man to exploit the livestock in rural areas without being the prey of wild animals like bears, Wolf, vulture, eagle and fox. Also allowed to leave cattle unattended when giving birth, and because the smell of placenta attracted predators, the use of the paridera was essential. Similarly, the period between the outbreak of cereals-about-until harvest in January–July and August, forcing the animals to be controlled when they were grazing, not to devastate crops. In addition, postpartum ewes and newborn lambs weaker and smaller, can not endure the summer heat and thus can not follow the herd. Goats and ewes that have recently given birth or about to give birth, often leave the herd. In prevention of this behavior or other difficulties they are being stored during the day and taking them to graze at night. The Paridera name in Spanish literally means farrowing.

Hygienic regulations for livestock and modern prefabricated buildings have been removed to the paridera its practical usefulness. Therefore, most are disappearing because their owners do not realize the re-roof. The roof of Arab tiles, due to their craft, often cracking with frost, causing leaks, which will eventually rot the rafters of the roof to cause its collapse. Those that remain can be visited in the villages of the mountainous north of Guadalajara and south of Soria and the whole semi-desert or mountainous Aragon.

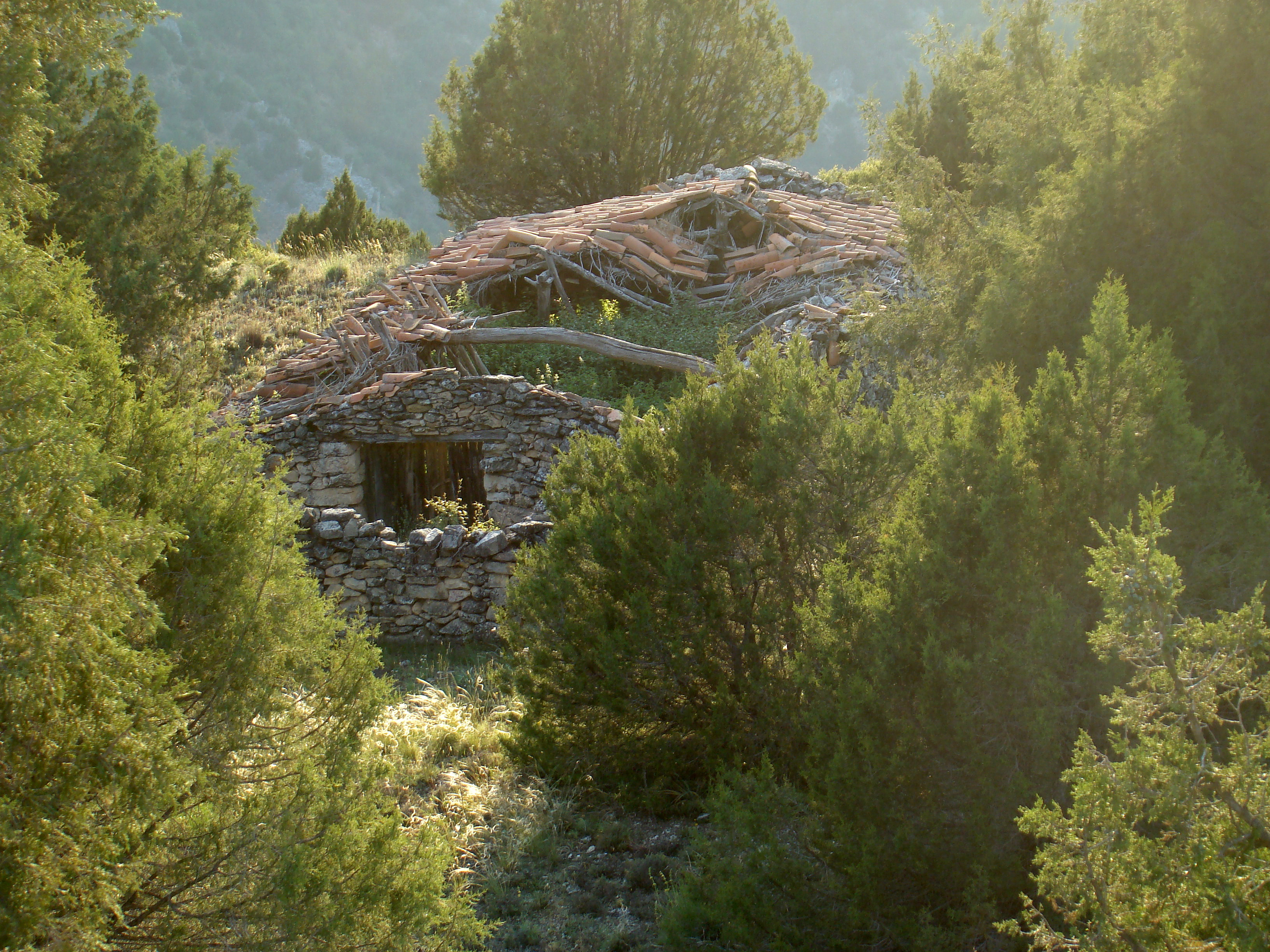

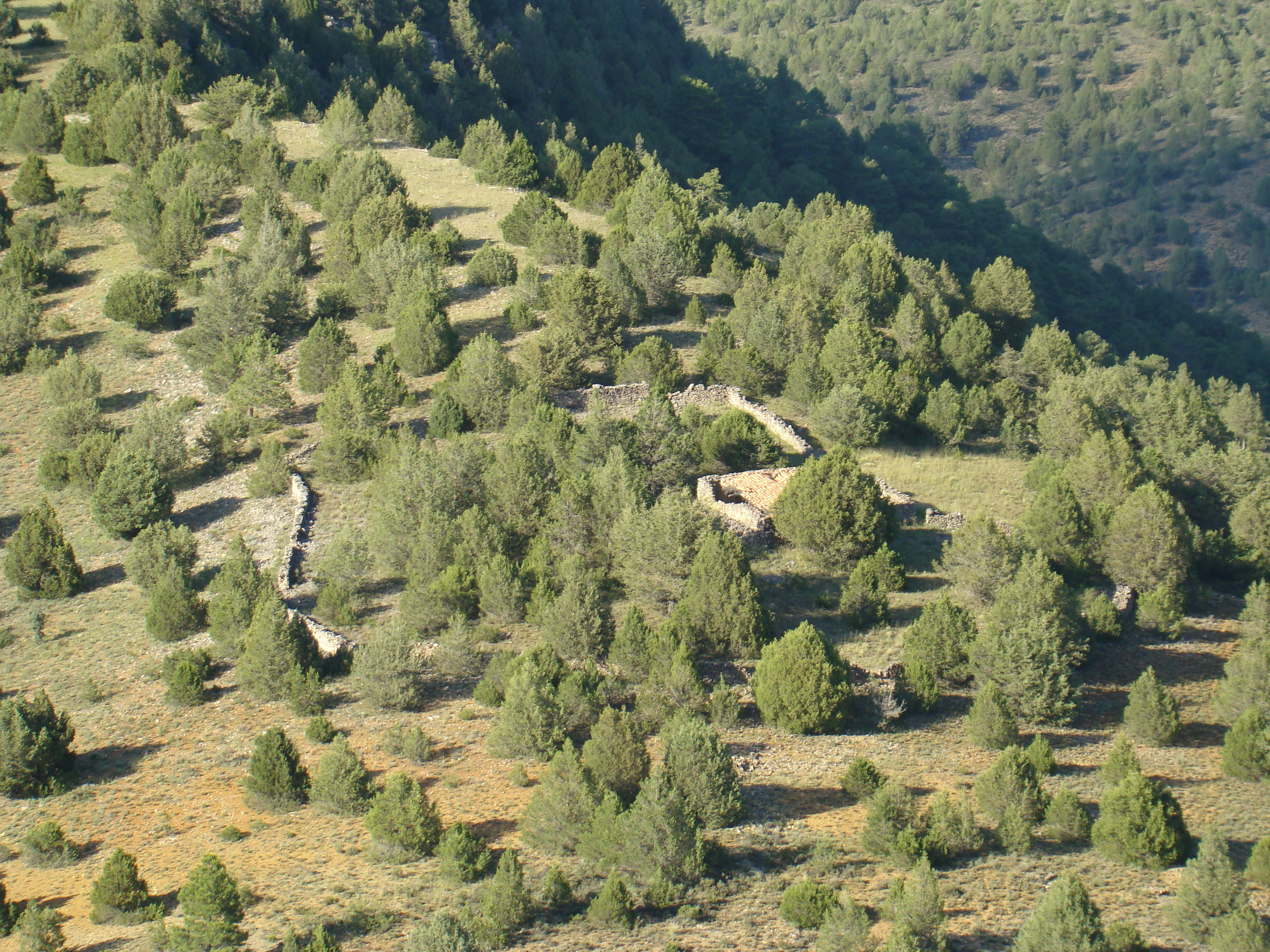

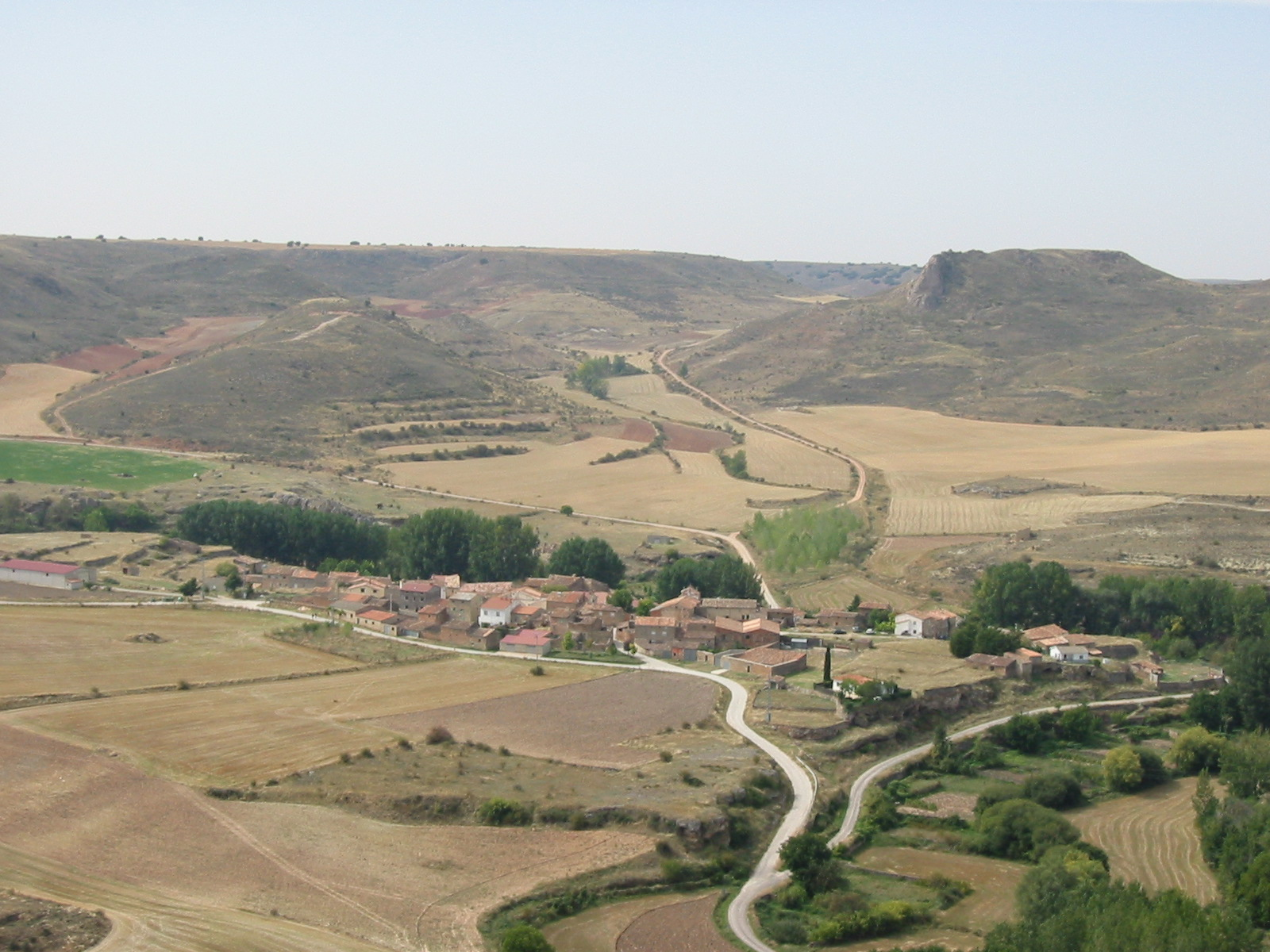

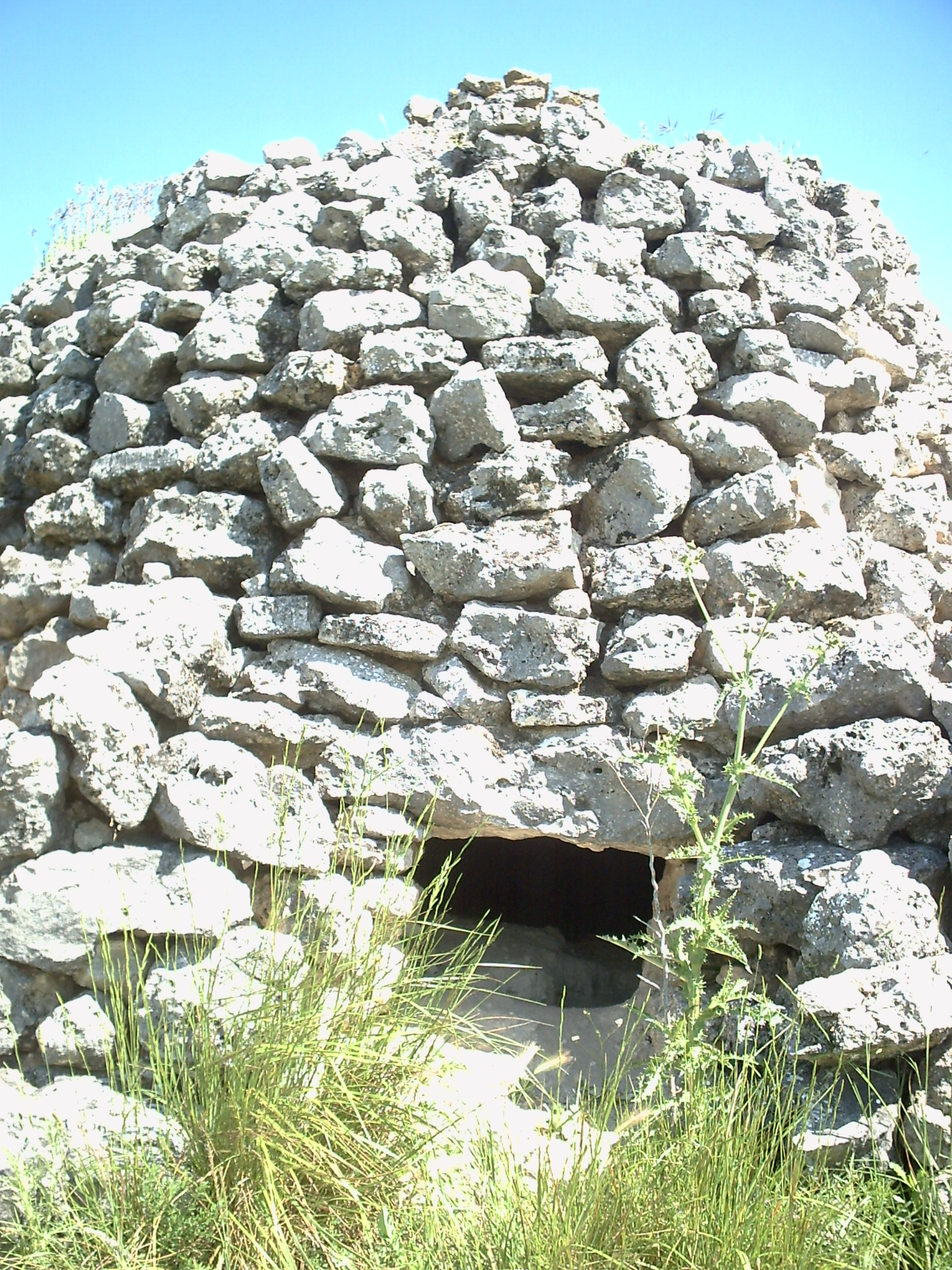

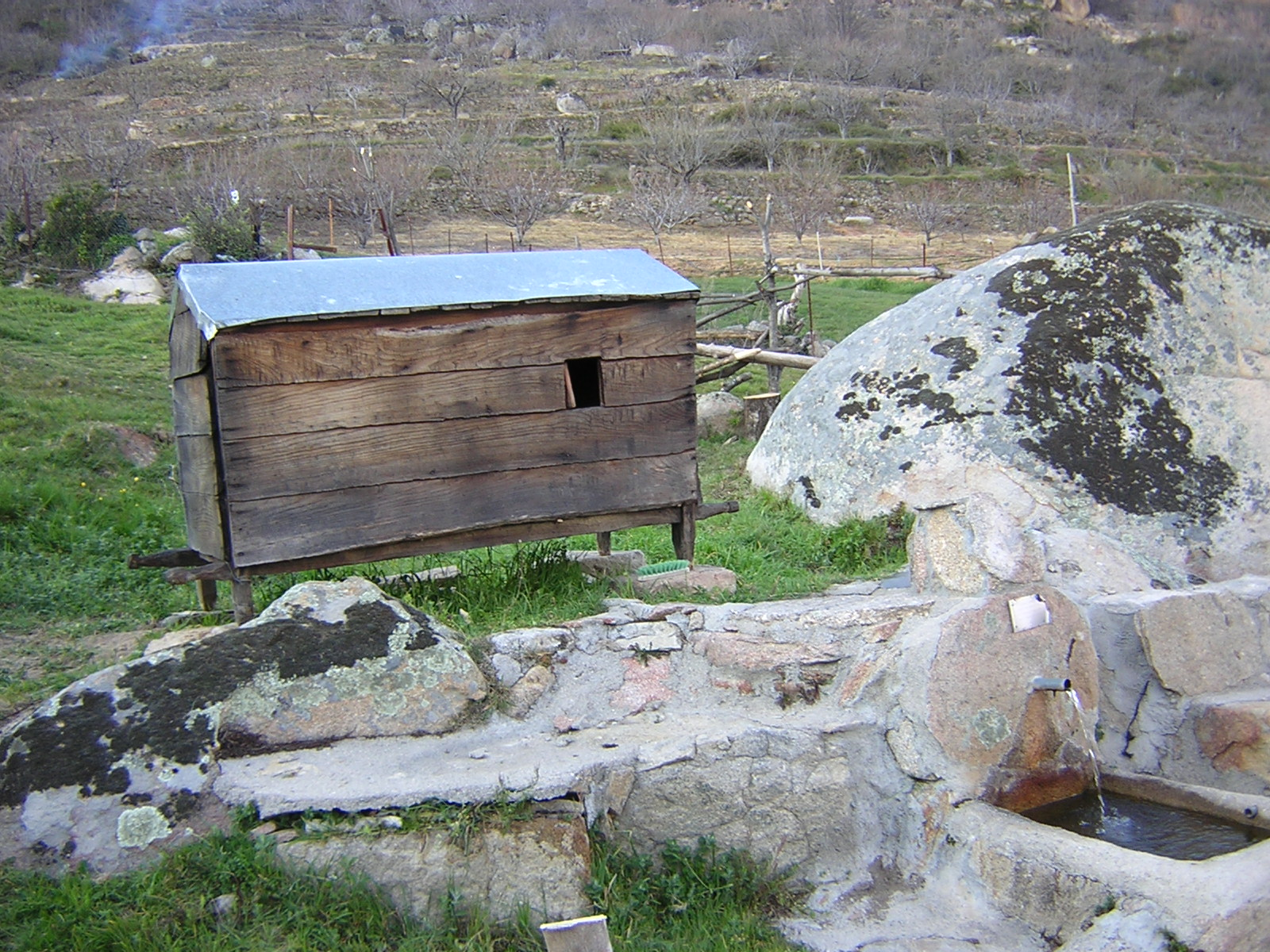

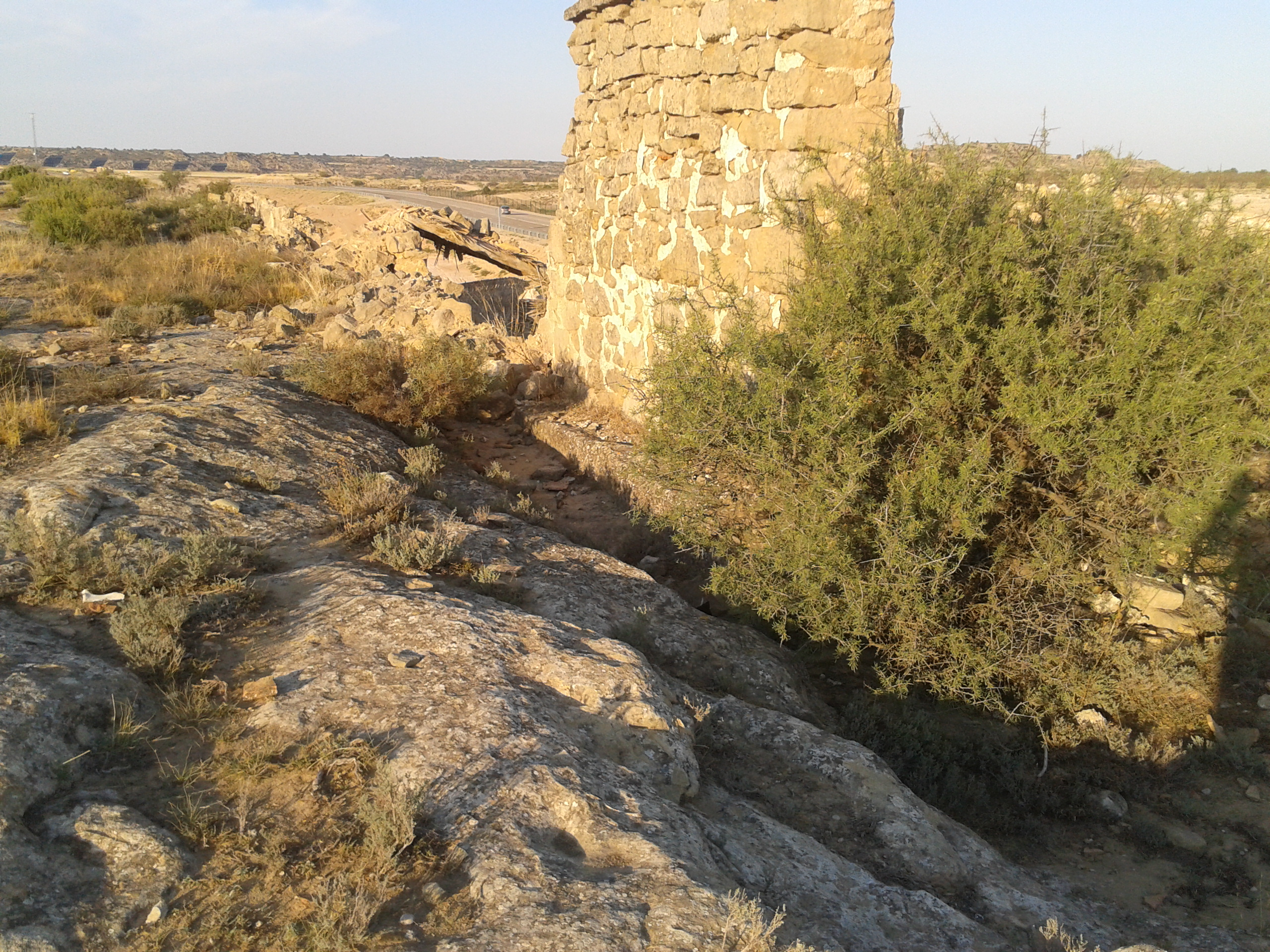

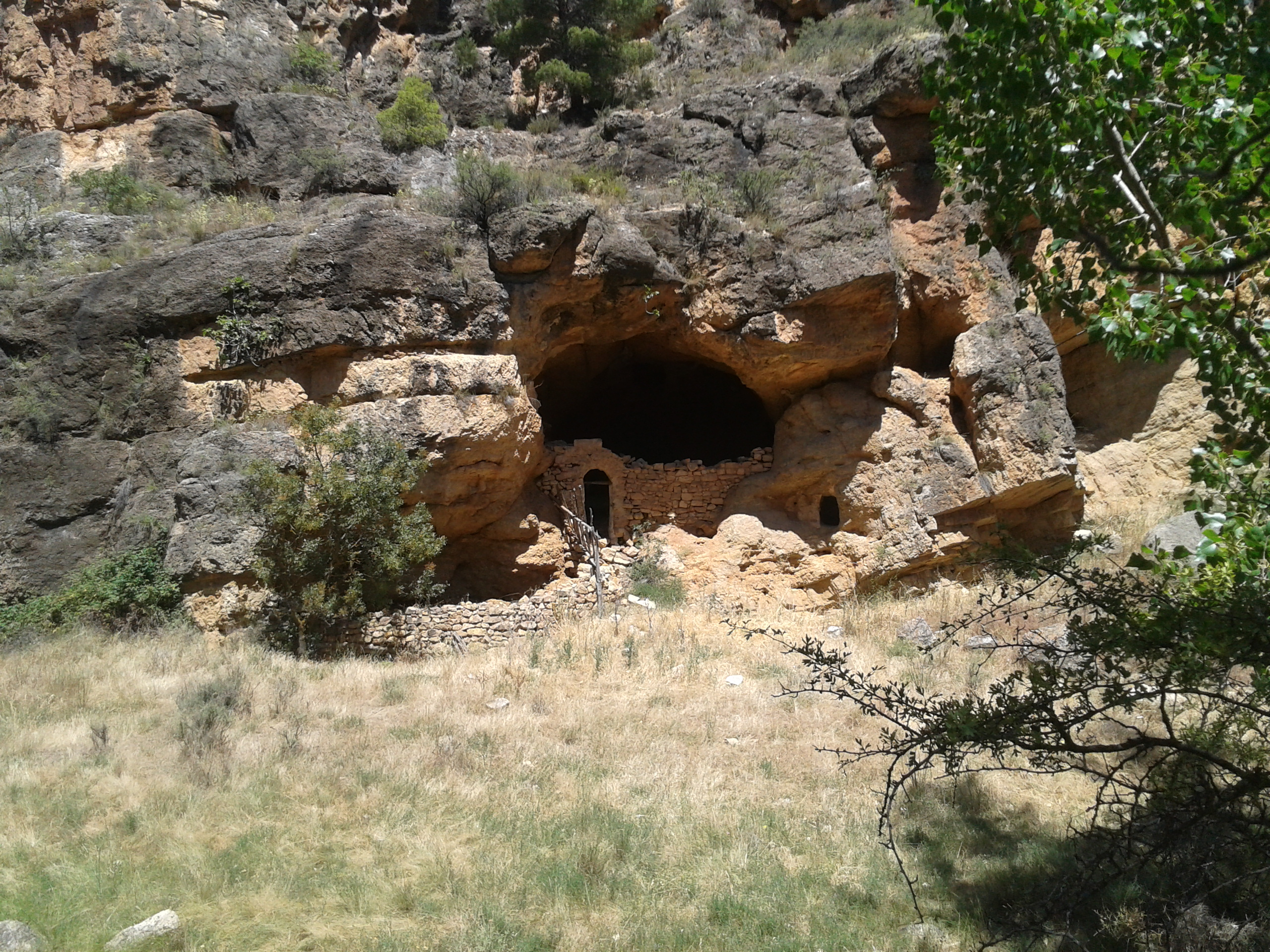

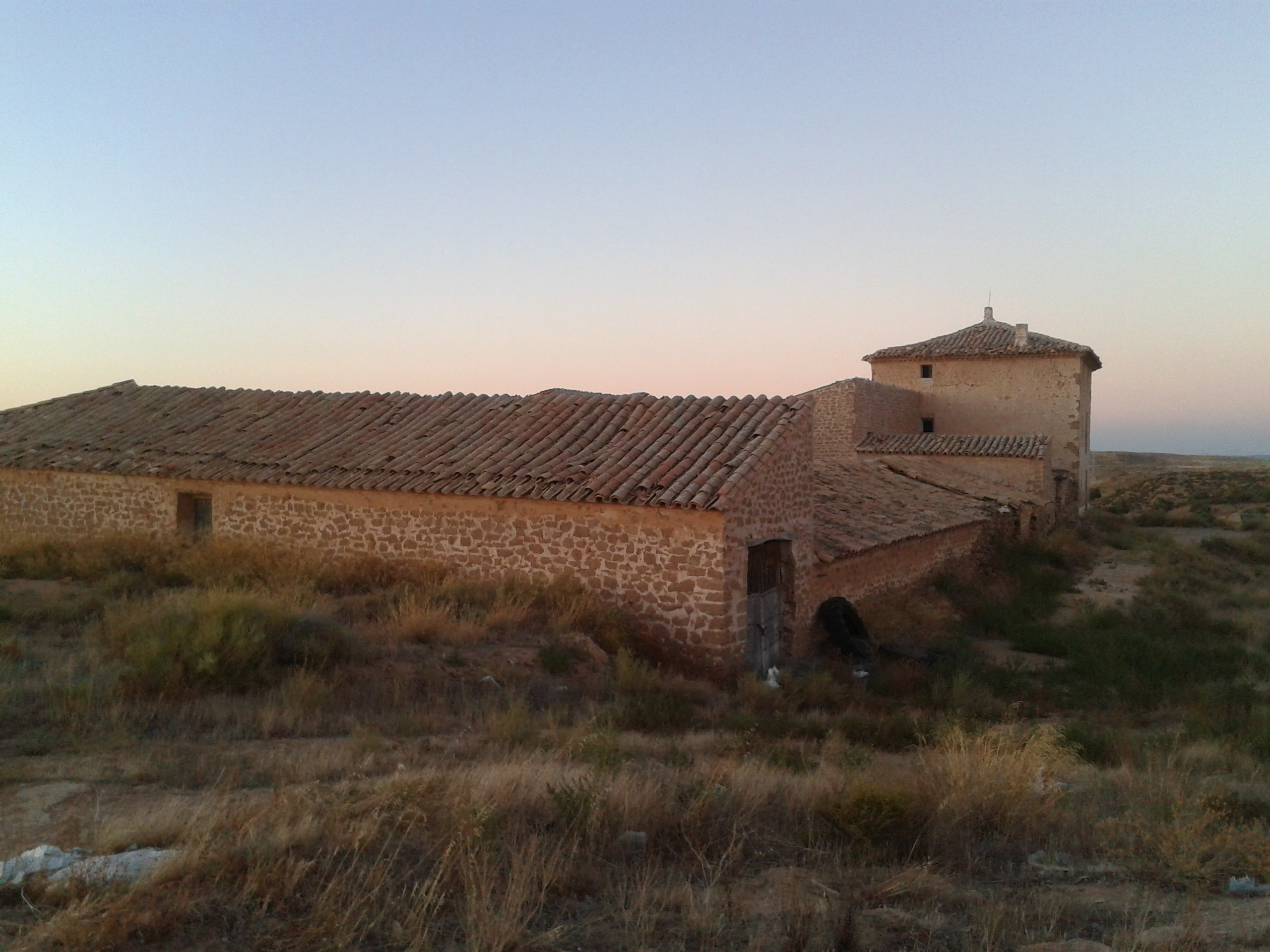

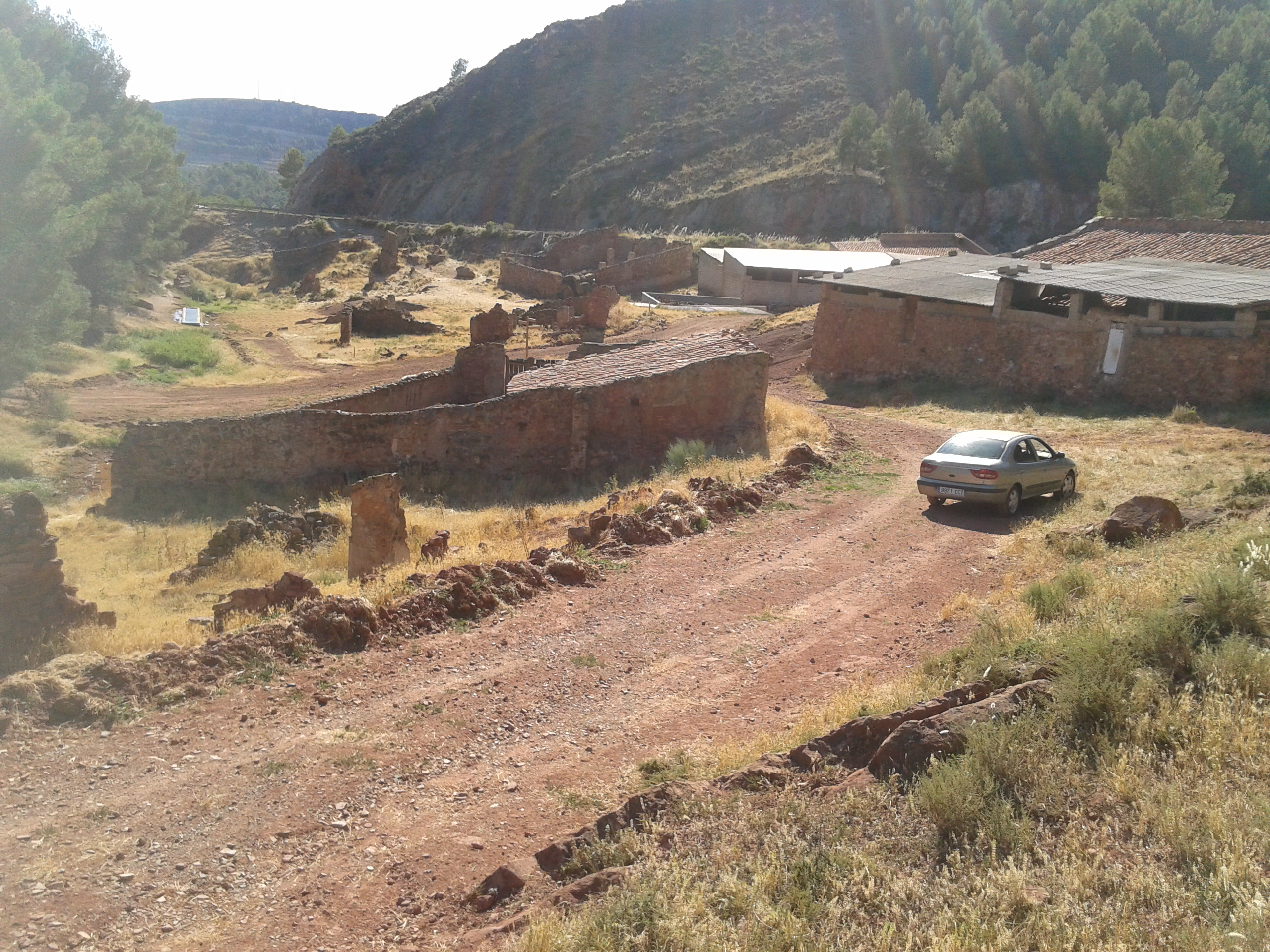

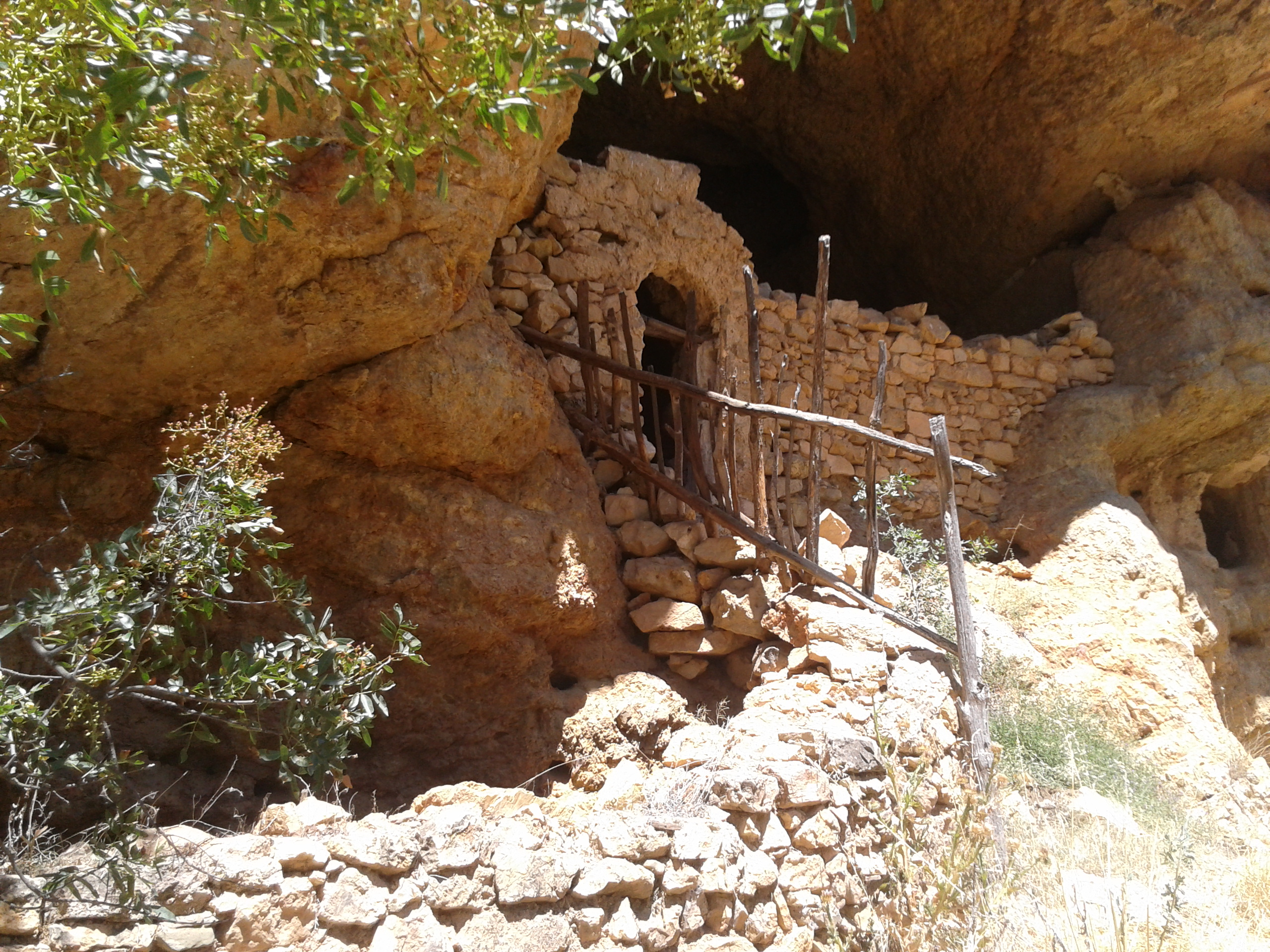
