= Comunidad de Teruel (comarca) =

Coordinates: 40°28′N 1°08′W

Comunidad de Teruel Comunidat de Teruel
- Comarca
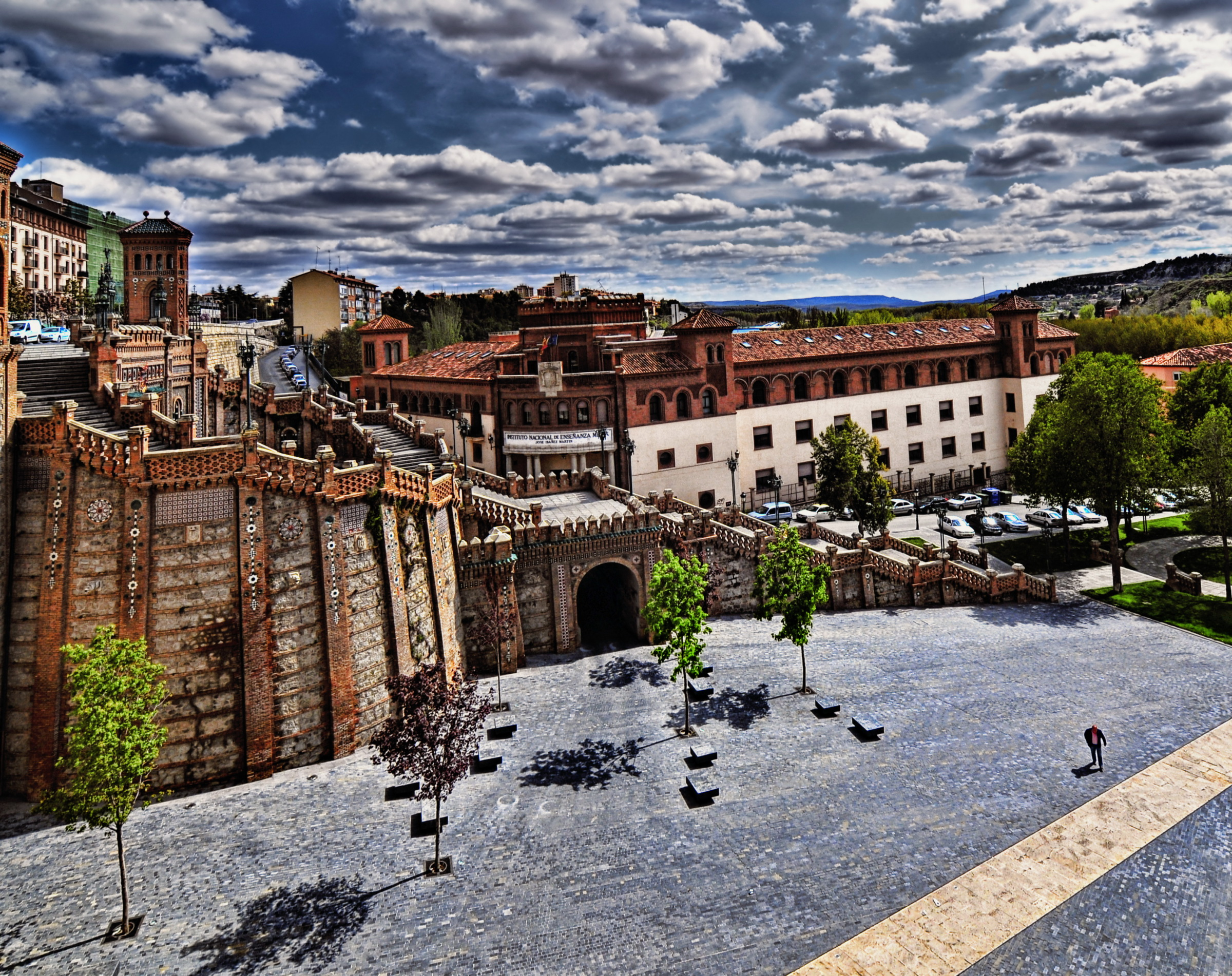
- View of La Escalinata in Teruel

- Country: Spain
- Autonomous community: Aragon
- Province: Teruel
- Capital: Teruel
- Municipalities: List: See text

Area
  - Total: 2,791.6 km^{2} (1,077.8 sq mi)

Population
  - Total: 43,273
  - Density: 15.501/km^{2} (40.148/sq mi)
- Time zone: UTC+1 (CET)
  - Summer (DST): UTC+2 (CEST)
- Largest municipality: Teruel

Communidad de Teruel is a comarca in Aragon, Spain. Its capital is Teruel, the capital of Teruel Province.

Teruel city gives its name to this comarca located in the mountainous Iberian System area.

== Municipalities ==
Ababuj, Aguatón, Aguilar del Alfambra, Alba, Alfambra, Almohaja, Alobras, Alpeñés, Argente, Camañas, Camarillas, Cañada Vellida, Cascante del Río, Cedrillas, Celadas, Cella, Corbalán, Cubla, El Cuervo, Cuevas Labradas, Escorihuela, Fuentes Calientes, Galve, Jorcas, Libros, Lidón, Monteagudo del Castillo, Orrios, Pancrudo, Peralejos, Perales del Alfambra, El Pobo, Rillo, Riodeva, Santa Eulalia del Campo, Teruel, Tormón, Torrelacárcel, Torremocha de Jiloca, Tramacastiel, Valacloche, Veguillas de la Sierra, Villarquemado, Villastar, Villel, Visiedo

== See also ==
- Teruel Province
