= Jiloca (river) =

River in Aragón, Spain

Jiloca Giloca
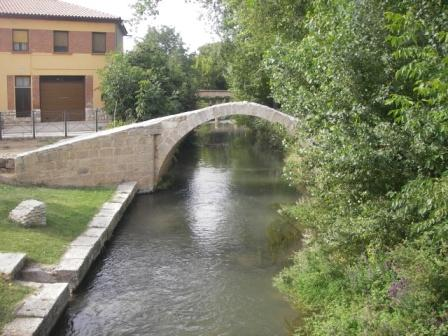
- The Jiloca in Calamocha, Teruel

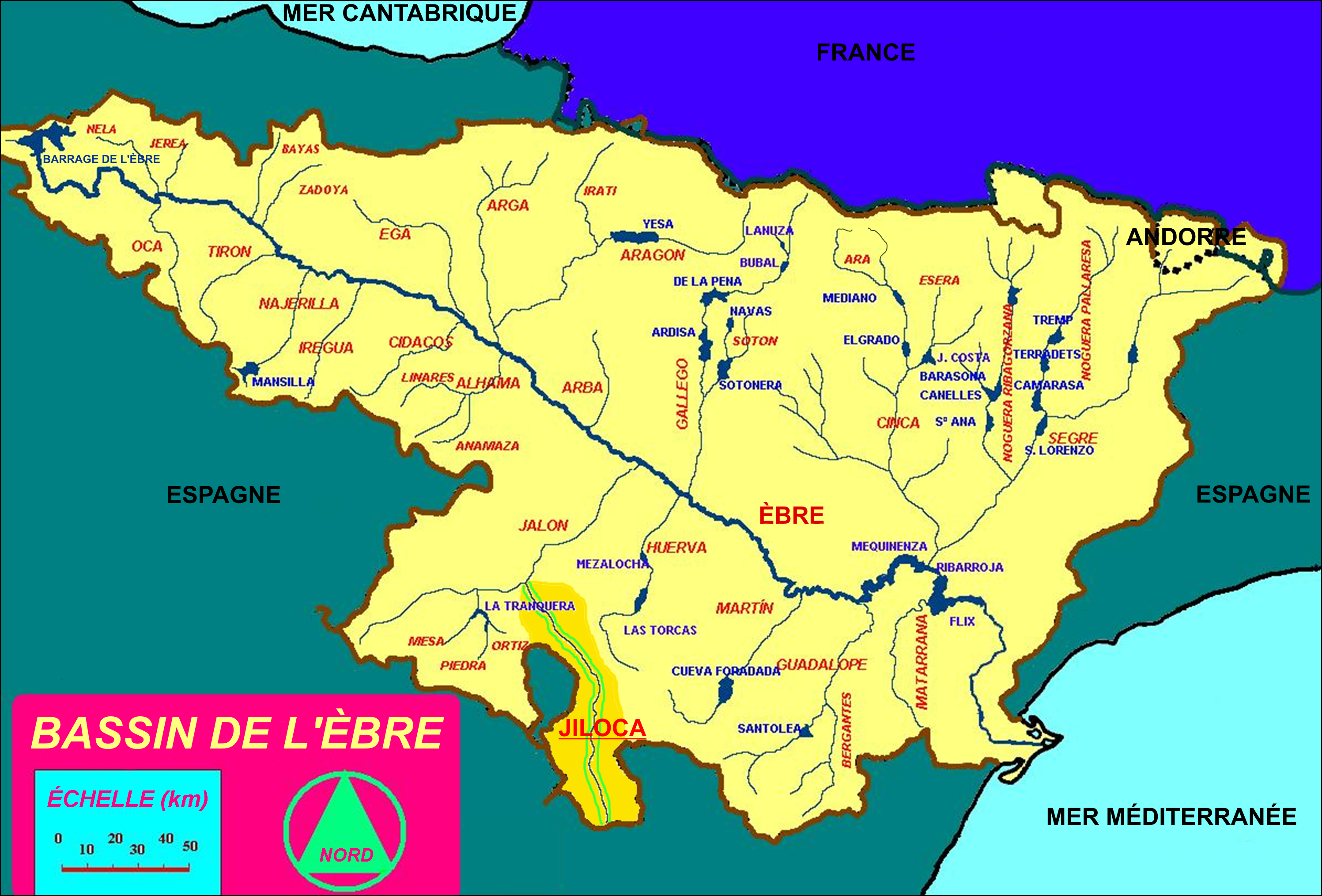
- Map of the Jiloca in the Ebro basin

Location
- Country: Spain
- Region: Aragón
- District: Teruel, Zaragoza
- City: Pancrudo

Physical characteristics
- Source: Ojos de Monreal
  - location: Monreal del Campo, Teruel, Aragón
  - coordinates: 40.76041°N 1.351933°W
  - elevation: 950 m (3,120 ft)
- 2nd source: Fuente de Cella
  - location: Cella, Teruel, Aragón
  - coordinates: 40.454602°N 1.286831°W
  - elevation: 1,036 m (3,399 ft)
- Mouth
  - location: Calatayud, Zaragoza, Aragón
  - coordinates: 41.340962°N 1.657459°W
  - elevation: 530 m (1,740 ft)
- Length: 126 km (78 mi)
- Basin size: 2,957 km^{2} (1,142 sq mi)
- Discharge
  - average: 2.1 m^{3}/s (74 cu ft/s)
  - minimum: 1.6 m^{3}/s (57 cu ft/s)
  - maximum: 3.4 m^{3}/s (120 cu ft/s)

Basin features
- Progression: Jalón→ Ebro→ Balearic Sea
- River system: Ebro

The Jiloca (Spanish pronunciation: [xiˈloka]) is a river in Aragón, Spain, a tributary of the river Jalón, and part of the watershed of the Ebro basin. The course of the river runs through the provinces of Teruel and Zaragoza. It has a length of 126 kilometres (78 mi) and an average flow rate of 2.1 cubic metres per second (74 cu ft/s), although this varies between the seasons. The river flows in a generally north easterly direction from its source near Monreal del Campo.

The valley was an historic route between the Meseta Central and the Mediterranean coast. Roman bridges remain in many pueblos and remains of watermills can be seen. The water is generally of good quality and supports a range of wildlife. Cleaning works by the regional government have been criticised by environmental organisations who claim that the ecology has been damaged. The watershed covers an area of 2,957 square kilometres (1,142 mi^{2}).

== Course ==
The source is disputed, tradition holds that it rises at an artesian well, the Fuente de Cella, at the base of the Sierra Albarracín in Teruel province. The well is surrounded by an elliptical parapet wall built by the Italian engineer Domingo Ferrari. It is now thought that the stretch of river between Cella and Monreal del Campo is the remains of an 18th-century canal which was cut to drain the Laguna Cañizar at Villarquemado. It is currently accepted that the Jiloca raises at the Ojos (Eyes) of Monreal, 2 kilometres (1.2 mi) from the town. These are a series of ponds linked by channels. From Monreal the river flows northwards and near Luco de Jiloca (Calamocha), the Jiloca is joined by its only tributary, the Pancrudo, which rises 46 kilometres (29 mi) away in the Sierra de la Costera. From this point there is an irrigation channel which waters a small valley near Daroca.

The river flows on from Daroca in a north easterly direction, past Manchones, Morero, Montón, Morata de Jiloca, Maruenda and Paracuellos de Jiloca until it joins the Jalón between Carramolina and Calatayud.

Towns named after the river are Morata de Jiloca, Paracuellos de Jiloca, Fuentes de Jiloca, Torremocha de Jiloca, Velilla de Jiloca and Villanueva de Jiloca.

=== Hydrographics ===
The Jiloca has an average flow rate of 2.1 cubic metres per second (74 cu ft/s), although there are seasonal variations, due to a long dry season and wet seasons in the spring and autumn in the Meseta Central. Annual rainfall in the watershed varies from around 400 millimetres (16 in) to 950 millimetres (37 in), with peak precipitation in May and June. The watershed covers an area of 2,957 square kilometres (1,142 mi^{2}).

== Natural history ==
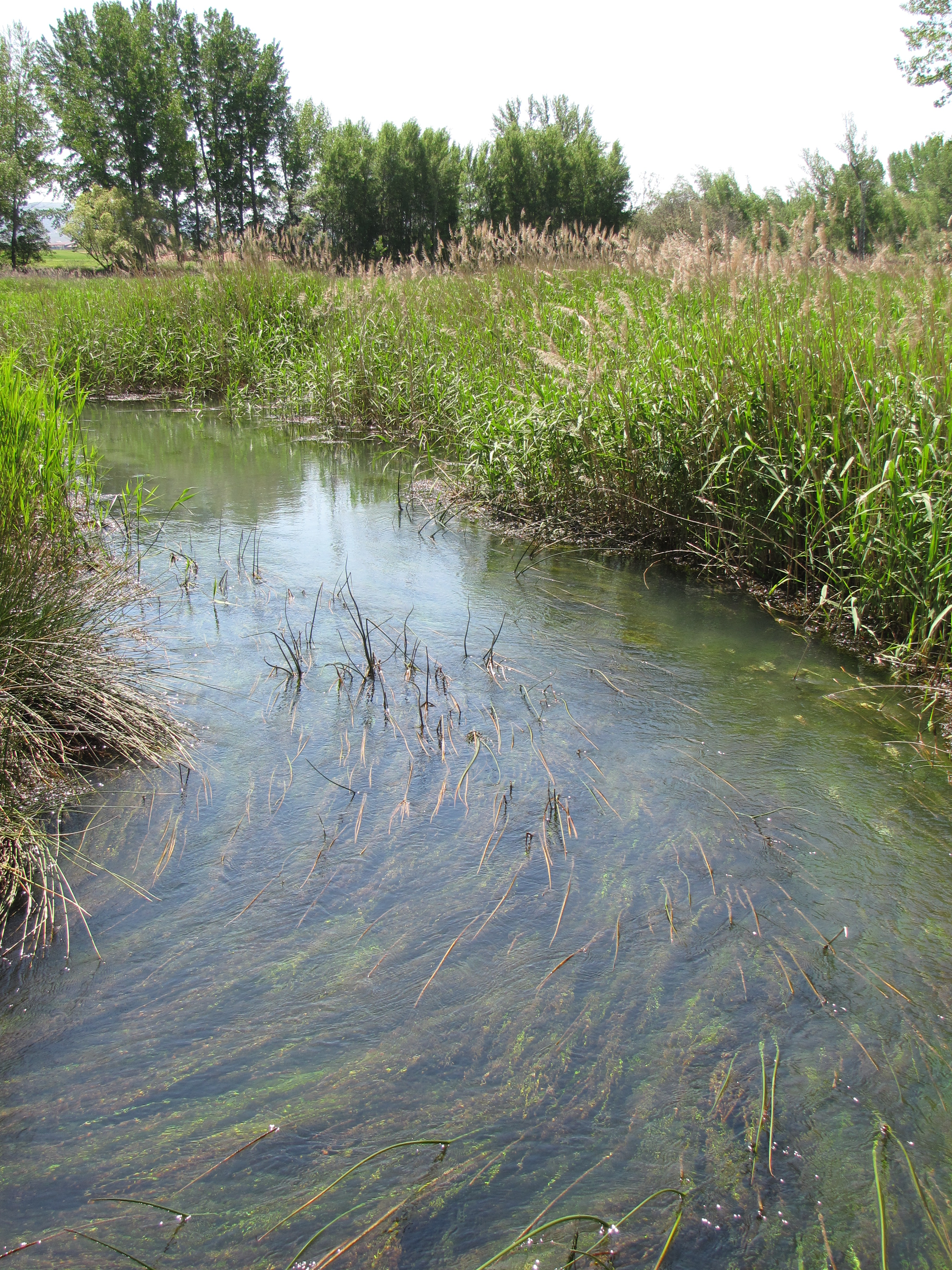
The Jiloca at the source, Ojos de Monreal

The Ojos de Monreal are a series of artesian wells which form pools connected by small channels. This area is rich in wildlife, including waterfowl, grebes, wrens, kingfishers, owls, orioles and woodpeckers. There are frequently visiting wildfowl from the Laguna de Gallocanta, some 23 kilometres (14 mi) away. Thickets of poplar, willow and walnut trees give plenty of shelter. The water is considered in very good condition according to the assessment of the Plan Hidrológico de la Cuenca del Ebro (Hydrological Plan of the Ebro).

Further downstream in the valley between Manchones and Morero, birdlife includes goshawks, eagles, orioles, robins, finches, hoopoe and kestrels. Deer and bobcats are found in the Sierra Santa Cruz which borders the river, hedgehogs and shrews are to be found near the banks. Trees include poplars, elm, and ash.

In 2000, the Asociación Naturalista de Aragón strongly condemned cleaning works by the regional government, which they said were systematically destroying riparian vegetation, killing fish and upsetting the ecology of the river in the reaches between Daroca and Calatayud. In November 2009, an investigation into soil erosion in the Jiloca basin was announced, with the intention of determining suitable future land use strategies.

== History ==
In the past many water-mills were powered by the river, but now only ruins of these remain. The valley of the Jiloca is an ancient route between the Meseta Central, the Ebro and the coast of the Levante. Many Roman bridges remain in the pueblos of the valley.

== Tributary ==
There is one tributary, the Pancrudo, which rises 3 kilometres (1.9 mi) above the pueblo of Pancrudo, in Teruel province and flows generally north east past Torre los Negros, Navarette del Rio and Lechago before joining the Jiloca at Luca de Jiloca after 46 kilometres (29 mi).

== See also ==
- List of rivers of Spain
- Ribera del Jiloca
- Jiloca Comarca
