= List of extreme temperatures in Spain =

The following are lists of the highest and lowest temperatures recorded in Spain.

== Highest temperatures ever recorded ==
On July 30, 1876 and August 4, 1881, temperatures of 51.0 °C (123.8 °F) and 50.0 °C (122.0 °F) were both reported for Seville: these readings are unreliable, since they were measured under a standard exposure and in poor technical conditions. A temperature of 48.8 °C (119.8 °F) was also recorded at Cazalla de la Sierra on August 30, 1926, but is generally not considered valid by international standards, along with other unofficial readings measured in various locations, probably taken without proper instruments. On July 17, 1978, an unconfirmed temperature of 47.5 °C (117.5 °F) was recorded at Barranco de Masca, Tenerife.

Temperature	Location	Date recorded
47.6 °C (117.7 °F)	La Rambla (Córdoba)	August 14, 2021
47.4 °C (117.3 °F)	Montoro (Córdoba)	August 14, 2021
47.3 °C (117.1 °F)	Montoro (Córdoba)	July 13, 2017
47.0 °C (116.6 °F)	Alcantarilla, Base Aérea, Murcia	August 15, 2021
46.9 °C (116.4 °F)	Córdoba	July 13, 2017 and August 14, 2021
46.8 °C (116.2 °F)	Valencia	August 10, 2023
46.6 °C (115.9 °F)	Morón de la Frontera	July 19, 1967
46.6 °C (115.9 °F)	Córdoba	July 23, 1995
46.6 °C (115.9 °F)	Seville	July 23, 1995
46.2 °C (115.2 °F)	Córdoba	August 1, 2003
46.2 °C (115.2 °F)	Tacorón Lapillas, El Hierro	August 12, 2023
46.1 °C (115.0 °F)	Alcantarilla, Base Aérea, Murcia	July 4, 1994
46.1 °C (115.0 °F)	Montoro (Córdoba)	August 10, 2012
46.0 °C (114.8 °F)	Jaén	July 8, 1939
46.0 °C (114.8 °F)	Llanos de Aridane, La Palma	August 20, 1953
46.0 °C (114.8 °F)	Écija	August 10, 2012
46.0 °C (114.8 °F)	Mengíbar	August 10, 2012
46.0 °C (114.8 °F)	Granada	August 14, 2021
45.9 °C (114.6 °F)	Seville	August 11, 2012
45.8 °C (114.4 °F)	La Rambla	August 10, 2012
45.8 °C (114.4 °F)	Tasarte, La Aldea de San Nicolás	August 12, 2023
45.9 °C (114.6 °F)	Ciudad Jardín, Córdoba	August 11, 2012
45.8 °C (114.4 °F)	Jerez de la Frontera	August 17, 2025
45.6 °C (114.1 °F)	Córdoba	July 20, 1967
45.6 °C (114.1 °F)	Córdoba	July 22 and 24, 1995
45.5 °C (113.9 °F)	La Oliva	July 4, 1994
45.5 °C (113.9 °F)	El Carpio	August 9, 2012
45.4 °C (113.7 °F)	Córdoba	July 17, 1978 and August 11, 2012
45.4 °C (113.7 °F)	Badajoz	July 13, 2017
45.2 °C (113.4 °F)	Córdoba	August 10, 2012
45.1 °C (113.2 °F)	Montoro, Córdoba	August 11, 2012
45.0 °C (113.0 °F)	Córdoba	June 26, 1965 and July 21, 1995
45.0 °C (113.0 °F)	Adamuz	August 9, 2012
44.9 °C (112.8 °F)	Morón de la Frontera	August 11, 2012
44.8 °C (112.6 °F)	Badajoz Airport	August 1, 2003
44.8 °C (112.6 °F)	La Rambla, Córdoba	August 11, 2012

== Lowest temperatures ever recorded ==
Nationwide, the official lowest temperature ever reported in Spain is −32.0 °C (−25.6 °F) in Estany Gento, Province of Lleida on 2 February 1956; although in recent years lower temperatures have been recorded by stations not belonging to AEMET, the lowest being −35.8 °C (−32.4 °F) at Vega de Liordes, in the Picos de Europa.

Temperature	Location	Date recorded
−32.0 °C (−25.6 °F)	Lake Gento, province of Lleida	February 2, 1956
−30.0 °C (−22.0 °F)	Calamocha	December 17, 1963
−28.2 °C (−18.8 °F)	Molina de Aragón	January 28, 1952
−28.0 °C (−18.4 °F)	Molina de Aragón	December 17, 1963
−28.0 °C (−18.4 °F)	Monreal del Campo	December 17, 1963 and January 4, 1971
−27.6 °C (−17.7 °F)	Ávila	January 1945
−27.2 °C (−17.0 °F)	Camesa de Valdivia, Aguilar de Campo	January 4, 1971
−27.0 °C (−16.6 °F)	Luco de Jiloca, Calamocha	December 17, 1963
−26.7 °C (−16.1 °F)	Molina de Aragón	January 31, 1947
−26.5 °C (−15.7 °F)	Torremocha de Jiloca, Teruel	January 12, 2021
−26.0 °C (−14.8 °F)	Lake Estangento, Lleida	January 9, 1954
−26.0 °C (−14.8 °F)	Port de la Bonaigua	February 1956
−25.4 °C (−13.7 °F)	Bello, Teruel	January 12, 2021
−25.2 °C (−13.4 °F)	Torremocha de Jiloca	December 24, 2001
−25.2 °C (−13.4 °F)	Molina de Aragón, Guadalaraja	January 12, 2021
−25.0 °C (−13.0 °F)	Sabiñánigo	January 31, 1954
−25.0 °C (−13.0 °F)	Polientes, Valderredible	January 4, 1971
−24.8 °C (−12.6 °F)	Sabiñánigo	February 1, 1954
−24.8 °C (−12.6 °F)	Erremendia, Salazar Valley	March 1, 2005
−24.6 °C (−12.3 °F)	Reinosa	January 4, 1971
−24.5 °C (−12.1 °F)	Calamocha	January 1971
−24.4 °C (−11.9 °F)	Calamocha	January 1947
−24.0 °C (−11.2 °F)	Lake Estangento, Lleida	February 1, 1954
−24.0 °C (−11.2 °F)	Port de la Bonaigua	February 1, 1954
−24.0 °C (−11.2 °F)	Vall de Núria	February 1956
−24.0 °C (−11.2 °F)	Villena	January 1957
−24.0 °C (−11.2 °F)	Albacete	January 3, 1971
−23.5 °C (−10.3 °F)	Torremocha de Jiloca	December 25, 2001
−23.0 °C (−9.4 °F)	Molina de Aragón	January 1971
−23.0 °C (−9.4 °F)	Riaño	?
−22.8 °C (−9.0 °F)	Candanchú	February 2, 1954
−22.8 °C (−9.0 °F)	Torremocha de Jiloca	December 26, 2001
−22.6 °C (−8.7 °F)	Erremendia, Salazar Valley	February 11, 2012
−22.0 °C (−7.6 °F)	Teruel	January 1945
−22.0 °C (−7.6 °F)	Castellfort, Castellón	February 2, 1954
−22.0 °C (−7.6 °F)	Burgos	January 3, 1971
−21.5 °C (−6.7 °F)	La Molina	February 11, 1956
−21.0 °C (−5.8 °F)	Teruel	January 12, 2021
−21.0 °C (−5.8 °F)	Burgos	January 20, 1885
−21.0 °C (−5.8 °F)	Riaño	February 5, 1954
−21.0 °C (−5.8 °F)	Vitoria	December 25, 1962
−21.0 °C (−5.8 °F)	Port de la Bonaigua	December 1962
−21.0 °C (−5.8 °F)	Vic	January 1971
−21.0 °C (−5.8 °F)	Teruel	January 1971
−20.6 °C (−5.1 °F)	Uña	February 3, 1954
−20.4 °C (−4.7 °F)	Lake Toba, Cuenca	February 3, 1954
−20.3 °C (−4.5 °F)	Navacerrada	December 25, 1962
−20.2 °C (−4.4 °F)	Molina de Aragón	February 1986
−20.0 °C (−4.0 °F)	Port de la Bonaigua	January 9, 1954
−20.0 °C (−4.0 °F)	Vielha e Mijaran	February 1, 1954
−20.0 °C (−4.0 °F)	Triollo	February 5, 1954
−20.0 °C (−4.0 °F)	Vall de Núria	February 5, 1954
−20.0 °C (−4.0 °F)	Salamanca	February 5, 1963

== Top 10 warmest days in Madrid ==
This list consists of the 10 warmest days ever recorded in Madrid, the capital city of Spain.

1. 40.7 °C, 14 July 2022
2. 40.7 °C, 14 August 2021
3. 40.7 °C, 28 June 2019
4. 40.6 °C, 10 August 2012
5. 40.3 °C, 13 August 2021
6. 40.0 °C, 29 June 2019
7. 40.0 °C, 17 June 2017
8. 40.0 °C, 20 August 1993
9. 39.9 °C, 3 August 2018
10. 39.8 °C, 15 August 2021

== Highest mean maximum temperatures ever recorded ==
The following list is the highest average mean maximum temperatures ever recorded in Spain, equal to or greater than 40 °C (104 °F). Cities in the interior of southern Spain recorded the highest average mean maximums temperatures ever in all of Europe.

Temperature	Location	Month recorded
41.4 °C (106.5 °F)	Montoro, Córdoba	July 2015
41 °C (106 °F)	Montoro, Córdoba	July 2022
40.9 °C (105.6 °F)	Montoro, Córdoba	July 2020
40.8 °C (105.4 °F)	Cazorla, Jaén	July 2009
40.5 °C (104.9 °F)	Fuente Palmera, Córdoba	July 2022
40.5 °C (104.9 °F)	Talavera de la Reina, Toledo	July 2022
40.4 °C (104.7 °F)	Córdoba	July 2022
40.4 °C (104.7 °F)	La Rambla, Córdoba	July 2022
40.3 °C (104.5 °F)	Córdoba	July 2015
40.3 °C (104.5 °F)	Andújar, Jaén	July 2022
40.3 °C (104.5 °F)	Écija	July 2020
40.3 °C (104.5 °F)	Candeleda, Ávila	July 2022
40.3 °C (104.5 °F)	Almadén, Ciudad Real	July 2022
40.2 °C (104.4 °F)	Morón de la Frontera, Seville	July 2022
40.2 °C (104.4 °F)	Montoro, Córdoba	August 2018
40.2 °C (104.4 °F)	Montoro, Córdoba	August 2023
40.2 °C (104.4 °F)	Andújar, Jaén	August 2023
40.1 °C (104.2 °F)	Montoro	July 2026
40.1 °C (104.2 °F)	Córdoba	August 2023

== Highest temperature per month ==
=== Peninsular Spain ===
Month	Temperature	Location	Date recorded
January	29.8 °C (85.6 °F)	Alicante	29 January, 2021
February	33.8 °C (92.8 °F)	Hellín	20 February, 1998
March	38 °C (100 °F)	Xàtiva	23 March, 2001
April	38.8 °C (101.8 °F)	Córdoba	27 April, 2023
May	44.4 °C (111.9 °F)	Carcaixent	14 May, 2015
June	46 °C (115 °F)	El Granado	28 June, 2025
July	47.3 °C (117.1 °F)	Montoro	13 July, 2017
August	47.6 °C (117.7 °F)	La Rambla	14 August, 2021
September	45.7 °C (114.3 °F)	Montoro	6 September, 2016
October	38.2 °C (100.8 °F)	Montoro and Seville	1 October, 2023 (Montoro), 2 October, 2023 (Seville)
November	33.2 °C (91.8 °F)	Coín	14 November, 2023
December	29.9 °C (85.8 °F)	Málaga	12 December, 2023
