= The Wasteland (2021 film) =

2021 Spanish horror drama film

- Promotional release poster
- Spanish: El páramo
- Directed by: David Casademunt
- Screenplay by: David Casademunt; Fran Menchón; Martí Lucas
- Story by: David Casademunt
- Produced by: Joaquín Padró; Marina Padró Targarona
- Starring: Inma Cuesta; Roberto Álamo; Asier Flores
- Cinematography: Isaac Vila
- Edited by: Alberto de Toro
- Music by: Diego Navarro
- Production companies: Netflix; Rodar y Rodar
- Distributed by: Netflix
- Release dates: 11 October 2021 (Sitges); 6 January 2022 (Netflix)
- Running time: 92 minutes
- Country: Spain
- Language: Spanish

The Wasteland (Spanish: El páramo), also known during the production stage as The Beast (La bestia), is a 2021 Spanish horror drama film directed by David Casademunt from a screenplay by Casademunt, Fran Menchón, and Martí Lucas. The film stars Inma Cuesta, Asier Flores, and Roberto Álamo. It was released on Netflix on 6 January 2022.

== Plot ==
Diego is a boy who lives with his parents in a shack in the middle of nowhere. His mother, Lucía, is kind, while his father, Salvador, is stern and solemn. One evening, Diego's father tells him about a beast that follows a person around and feeds on their fear.

One day, the family finds a badly injured man in a boat. Salvador attempts to heal the man. The man wanders into the shack and picks up a rifle, pointing it at Diego and Lucía. A gunshot is heard, and the man is seen, shot in the head. While going through his belongings, they find a family portrait. That night, Diego's father tells him about his sister, who saw the beast at their home. Salvador, who cannot see the beast, tells Diego that if anyone spots it, their life becomes hopeless. Salvador decides to go find the man's family on his own.

Over the following days, Lucía sees a presence approaching the shack each night; Diego doesn't see it. His mother begins to act erratically and cuts off her hair. She tells Diego that the presence is outside and pushes him out, telling him the beast desires her. Diego forces his way back into the shack and finds his mother badly injured on the floor. He then sees the beast walking towards them. Diego eventually finds enough courage to face the beast; he picks up a gun and shoots at it. He then sets the shack on fire and drags his mother outside. He puts her in a wheelbarrow and wheels towards the river, only to find out that she has died. He floats her body down the river and walks purposefully away.

== Cast ==
- Inma Cuesta as Lucía
- Roberto Álamo as Salvador
- Asier Flores as Diego
- Alejandra Howard as Juana
- Víctor Benjumea as the man in the boat

== Production ==
Spanish filmmaker David Casademunt initially conceived the original concept for the film in 2012 and began to develop the idea into a screenplay. In September 2017, the film officially entered development as part of the Sitges Film Festival Pitchbox program, with Casademunt set to direct the project from his own screenplay. Within the following year, the film received backing from Ventana Sur's Blood Window pitching program in Latin America and funding from The Madrid Film School. The script was completed by August 2018, and the Toronto International Film Festival invited Casademunt to their Filmmaker Lab for backing and financing. He described the selection as a "huge prize" and said that he would create a film that "could be loved by all audiences".

In February 2020, Spanish production company Rodar y Rodar joined the project as the main producer. Marina Padró of Rodar y Rodar called Casademunt a "new promise of the Spanish cinema". Frequent collaborators Fran Menchón and Martí Lucas were credited as co-writers of the screenplay, and Casademunt described the feature as "a film about the demons we have inside [and] how these demons transform us into defective adults." During a press conference in October 2020, it was announced that Netflix had acquired worldwide distribution rights to the project. Inma Cuesta, Roberto Álamo, and Asier Flores were cast in lead roles in February 2021.

Principal photography began in early February 2021 and lasted until July of that year. Filming predominantly took place in a moorland in the province of Teruel, as well as in the municipalities of Blancas and Villarquemado, with the lagoons of Gallocanta and El Cañizar serving as shooting locations.

== Release ==
The film was set for a world premiere on 11 October 2021 at the 54th Sitges Film Festival, as part of the festival's official selection.

It was released on Netflix worldwide on 6 January 2022.

== Reception ==
Reviewing for Cinemanía, Miguel Ángel Romero gave the film 3 out of 5 stars and considered that Inma Cuesta and Asier Flores reflect the delicacy of the human mind. He also pointed out that the film helps in the visibility of mental illnesses at a time when mental health advocacy is paramount.

Raquel Hernández Luján of HobbyConsolas gave it 68 out of 100 points, considering the atmosphere, the performances, and the musical score to be the best about the film, while negatively assessing that the film features repetitive parts and moments in which the internal logic is compromised.

== See also ==
- List of Spanish films of 2022
