= Arnaldus de Villa Nova =

Physician and alchemist of Crown of Aragon

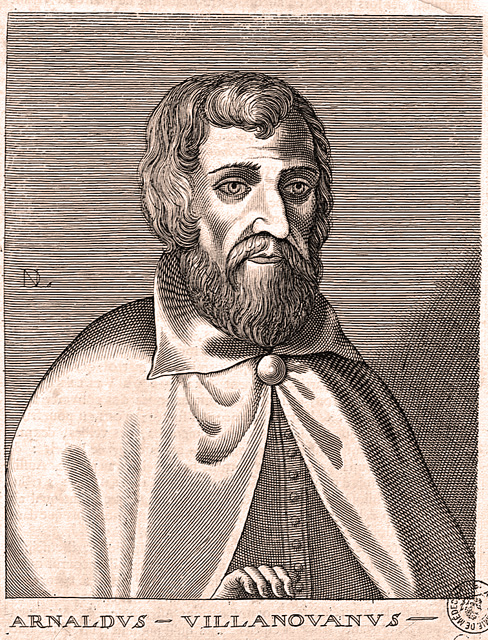
- Born: c.1240 unknown
- Died: c.1311 Genoa

Arnaldus de Villa Nova (also called Arnau de Vilanova, Arnaldus Villanovanus, Arnaud de Ville-Neuve or Arnaldo de Villanueva, c. 1240–1311) was a physician and a religious reformer.

He is credited with translating a number of medical texts from Arabic, including works by Ibn Sina (Avicenna), Abu-l-Salt and Galen.

== Biography ==
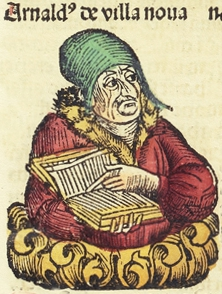
Generic portrait of Arnald[us] de villa noua, woodcut from the Nuremberg Chronicle, 1493

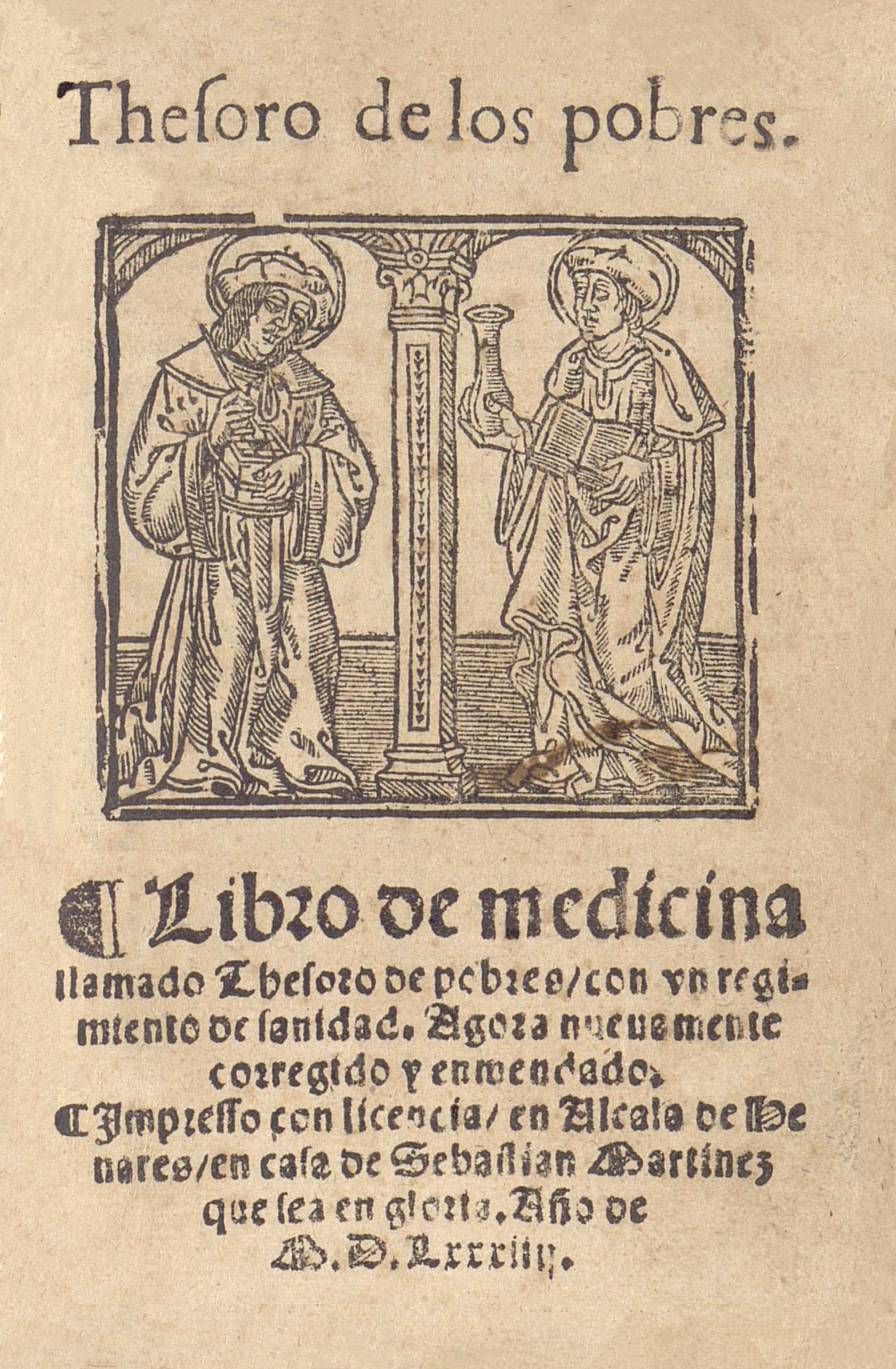
Thesoro de los pobres (1584).

Arnaldus' place and date of birth are debated: some historians believe he was born in Villeneuve-lès-Maguelone, a village near Montpellier; others are doubtful because there are also towns of the same name in Aragon such as Villanueva de Jiloca, in the Kingdom of Valencia, in Catalonia, in Languedoc and in Provence. Regardless, he is known in Catalonia, Valencia and the Balearic Islands by the name "Arnau de Vilanova" and it is certain that he wrote most of his works in Catalan (Confessió de Barcelona, Raonament d'Avinyó). Whatever the reality, Arnaldus had a reputation as a doctor, theologian and alchemist.

He studied medicine in Montpellier until 1260. He travelled through France, Catalonia and Italy as doctor and ambassador. He lived at the court of Aragon and was the personal physician of the King of Aragon from 1281. At the death of Peter III of Aragon in 1285, he left Barcelona for Montpellier, where he taught at the School of Medicine.

He was the master of the school of medicine of Paris between 1291 and 1299. His fame as a doctor was immense: among his patients were three popes and three kings. He was the first physician to use alcohol as an antiseptic.

Influenced by Joachim of Fiore, he claimed that in 1378 the world would end and the Antichrist would come (De adventu Antichristi, 1288). He was condemned by the University of Paris in 1299, accused of heresy, and imprisoned for his ideas on church reform. He was saved through the intervention of Boniface VIII, whom Arnaldus had cured of a painful illness. He was once again imprisoned in Paris around 1304, under pope Benedict XI. The Sorbonne ordered his philosophical works to be burned.

He became an ambassador for James II, king of Aragon and Sicily. He sought refuge from the Inquisition at the court of Frederick III in Sicily and was later called to Avignon as a doctor for pope Clement V. He is certainly behind the papal bull of 8 September 1309, which required of medical students knowledge of some fifteen Greco-Arabic treatises, including ones by Galen and Avicenna.

In 1311 he was summoned to Avignon by Pope Clement V but he died on the voyage off the coast of Genoa. The inquisitor of Tarragona condemned him and fifteen of his propositions were censured. Arnaldus also bequeathed several of his books to the Carthusian monastery of Scala Dei to which he had already dedicated one of his books.

== Writings ==
Arnaldus was also thought to be an alchemist: the door to his house in Montpellier, France, had carved depictions of a roaring lion and dragon biting its own tail (an Ouroboros), both alchemical symbols, and several renowned alchemists recognized him as an adept. He was also known as an astrologer.

Many alchemical writings, including Rosarius Philosophorum, Novum Lumen, or Flos Florum, are also ascribed to him, but they are not authentic. Collected editions of them were published at Lyon in 1504 and 1532 (with a biography by Symphorianus Campegius), at Basel in 1585, and at Lyon in 1686. He is also the reputed author of important medical works, such as Speculum medicinae and Regimen sanitatis ad regem Aragonum, but many others, such as Breviarium Practicae, were falsely attributed to him. In addition, he wrote many theological works for the reformation of Christianity in Latin and in Catalan, some of them including apocalyptical prophecies.

He is the author of a short treatise called De Vinis, on the medicinal use of wine and the way spoiled wine could be improved.

A list of writings is given by J. Ferguson in his Bibliotheca Chemica (1906). See also U. Chevalier, Repertoire des sources hist., &c., Bio-bibliographie (Paris, 1903).

== See also ==
- Brazen Head
- Latin translations of the 12th century
- Litmus
