= Morata de Jiloca =

- municipality
- Flag Coat of arms

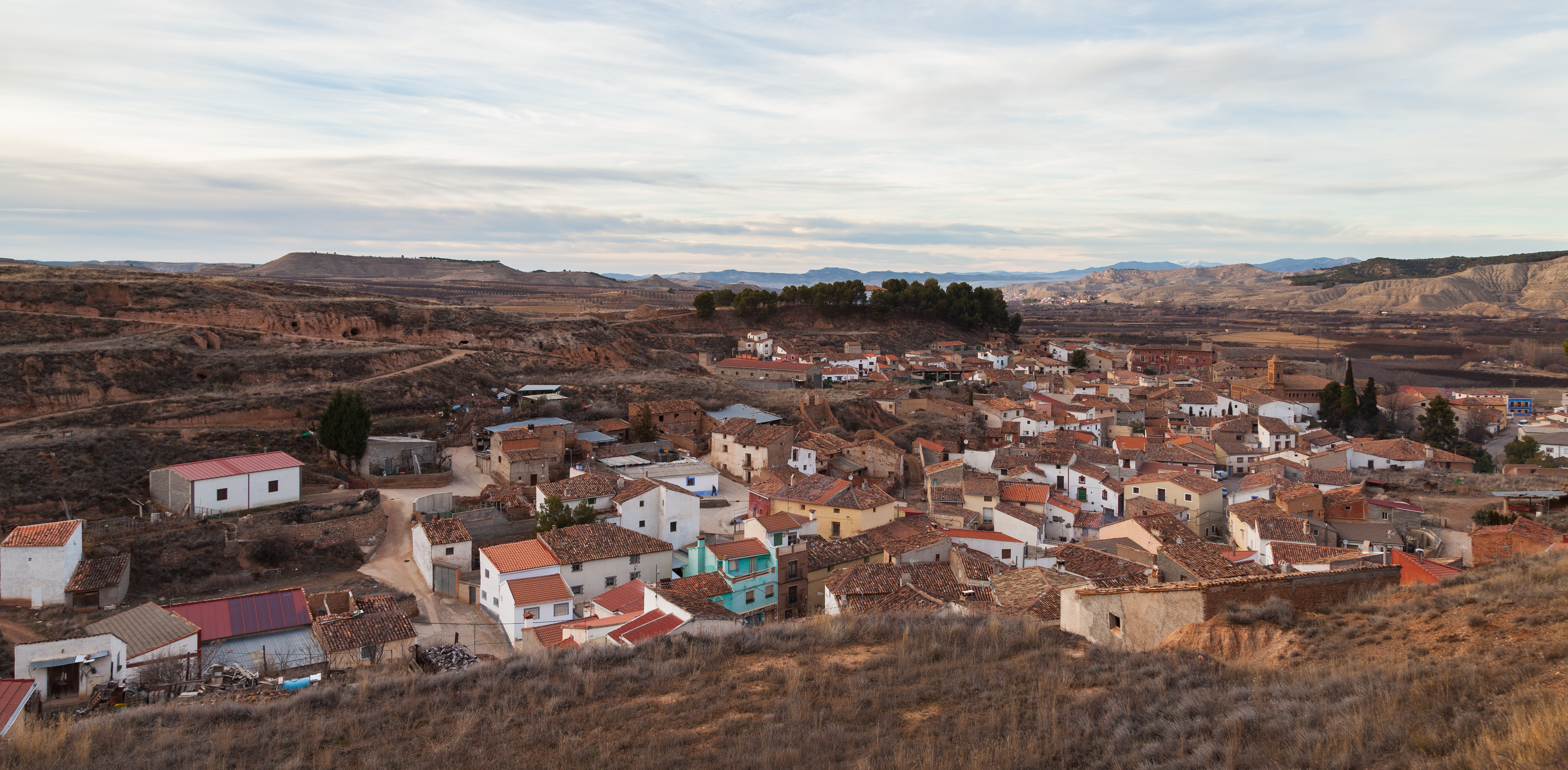

- Location within Aragon Location within Spain Location within Europe
- Country: Spain
- Autonomous community: Aragon
- Province: Zaragoza
- Comarca: Comunidad de Calatayud

Area
  - Total: 22 km^{2} (8.5 sq mi)
- Elevation: 619 m (2,031 ft)

Population (2025-01-01)
  - Total: 285
  - Density: 13/km^{2} (34/sq mi)
- Time zone: UTC+1 (CET)
  - Summer (DST): UTC+2 (CEST)

Morata de Jiloca is a municipality on the river Jiloca, located in the province of Zaragoza, Aragon, Spain. At the 2018 census (INE), the municipality had a population of 282 inhabitants.

== See also ==
- Comunidad de Calatayud
- List of municipalities in Zaragoza
