= Paracuellos de Jiloca =

Coordinates: 41°19′N 1°38′W

- municipality
- Flag Coat of arms

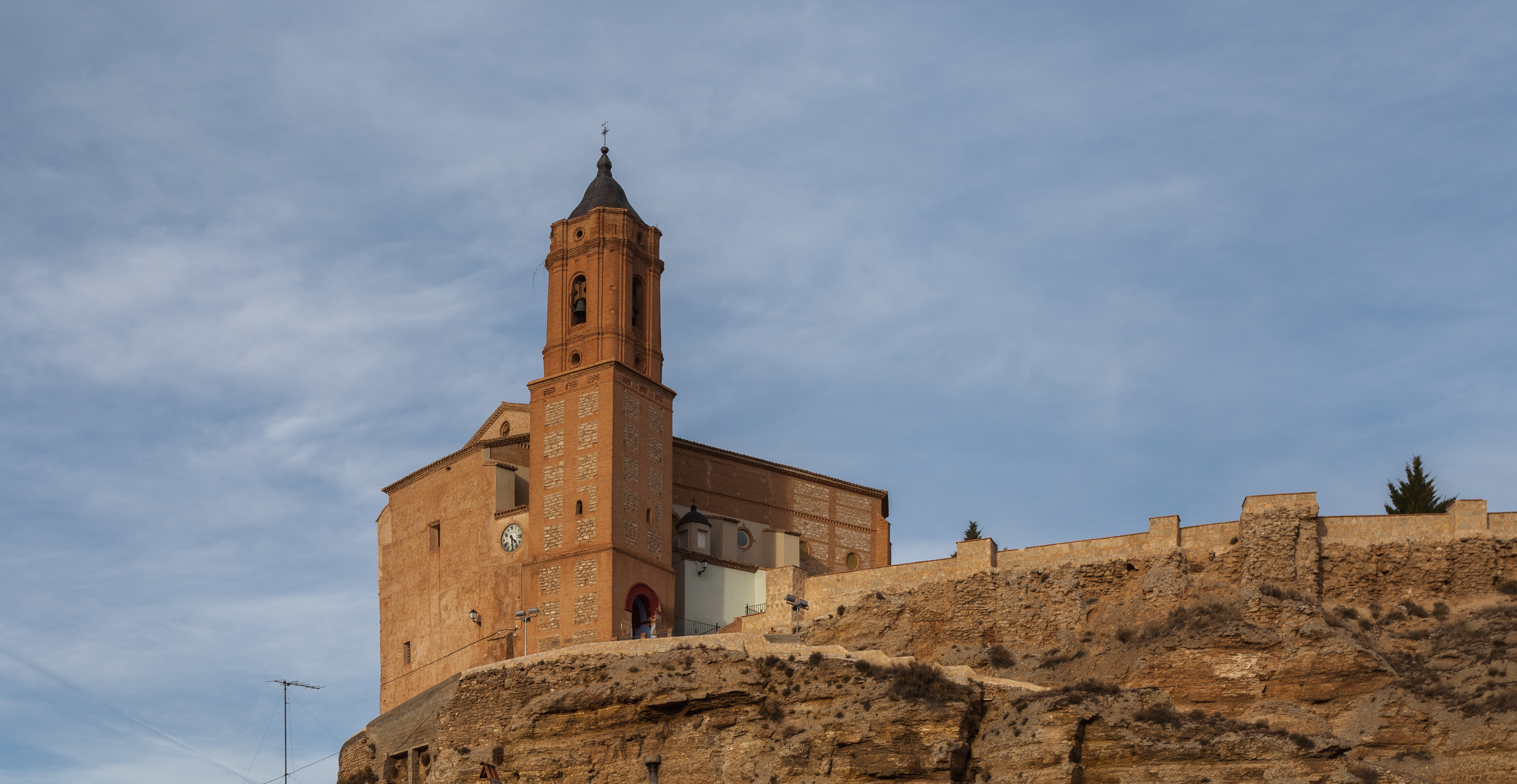
- Country: Spain
- Autonomous community: Aragon
- Province: Zaragoza

Area
  - Total: 32.22 km^{2} (12.44 sq mi)
- Elevation: 586 m (1,923 ft)

Population (2025-01-01)
  - Total: 610
  - Density: 19/km^{2} (49/sq mi)
- Time zone: UTC+1 (CET)
  - Summer (DST): UTC+2 (CEST)

Paracuellos de Jiloca is a municipality on the river Jiloca, located in the province of Zaragoza, Aragon, Spain. According to the 2004 census (INE), the municipality has a population of 507 inhabitants.

== See also ==
- List of municipalities in Zaragoza
