= Ababuj =

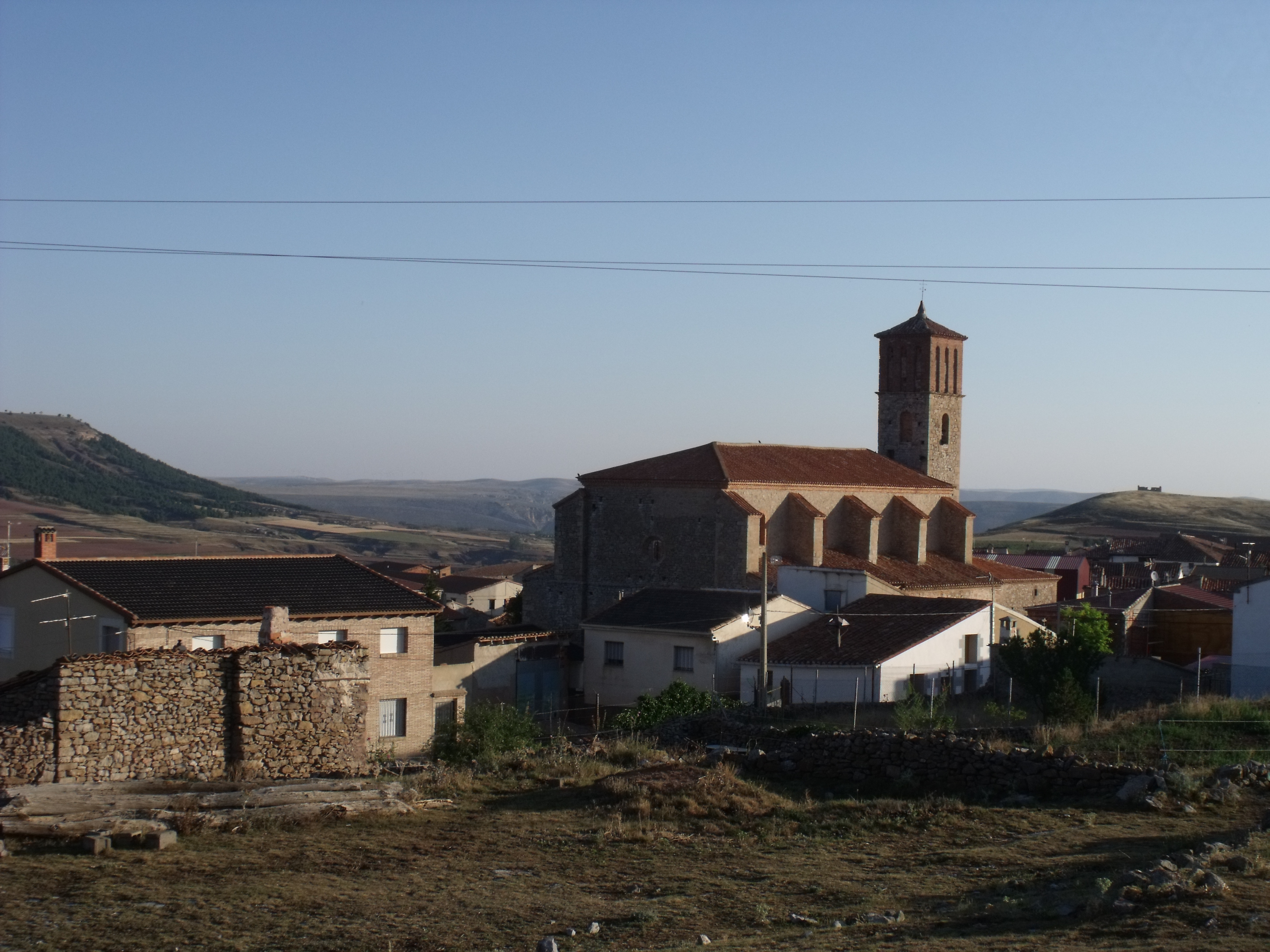

- Coat of arms

- Location within Aragon Location within Spain
- Coordinates: 40°33′N 0°48′W
- Country: Spain
- Autonomous community: Aragon
- Province: Teruel
- Comarca: Comunidad de Teruel

Area
  - Total: 54.30 km^{2} (20.97 sq mi)
- Elevation: 1,368 m (4,488 ft)

Population (2025-01-01)
  - Total: 73
  - Density: 1.3/km^{2} (3.5/sq mi)
- Time zone: UTC+1 (CET)
  - Summer (DST): UTC+2 (CEST)

Ababuj (Spanish pronunciation: [abaˈbux]) is a municipality located in the Comunidad de Teruel comarca, province of Teruel, Aragon, Spain. According to the 2010 census the municipality had a population of 77 inhabitants. Its postal code is 44155.

The town is located at high elevation between the Sierra del Pobo and Sierra de Gúdar, part of the Sistema Ibérico.

== See also ==
- Comunidad de Teruel
- List of municipalities in Teruel
