= Lidón =

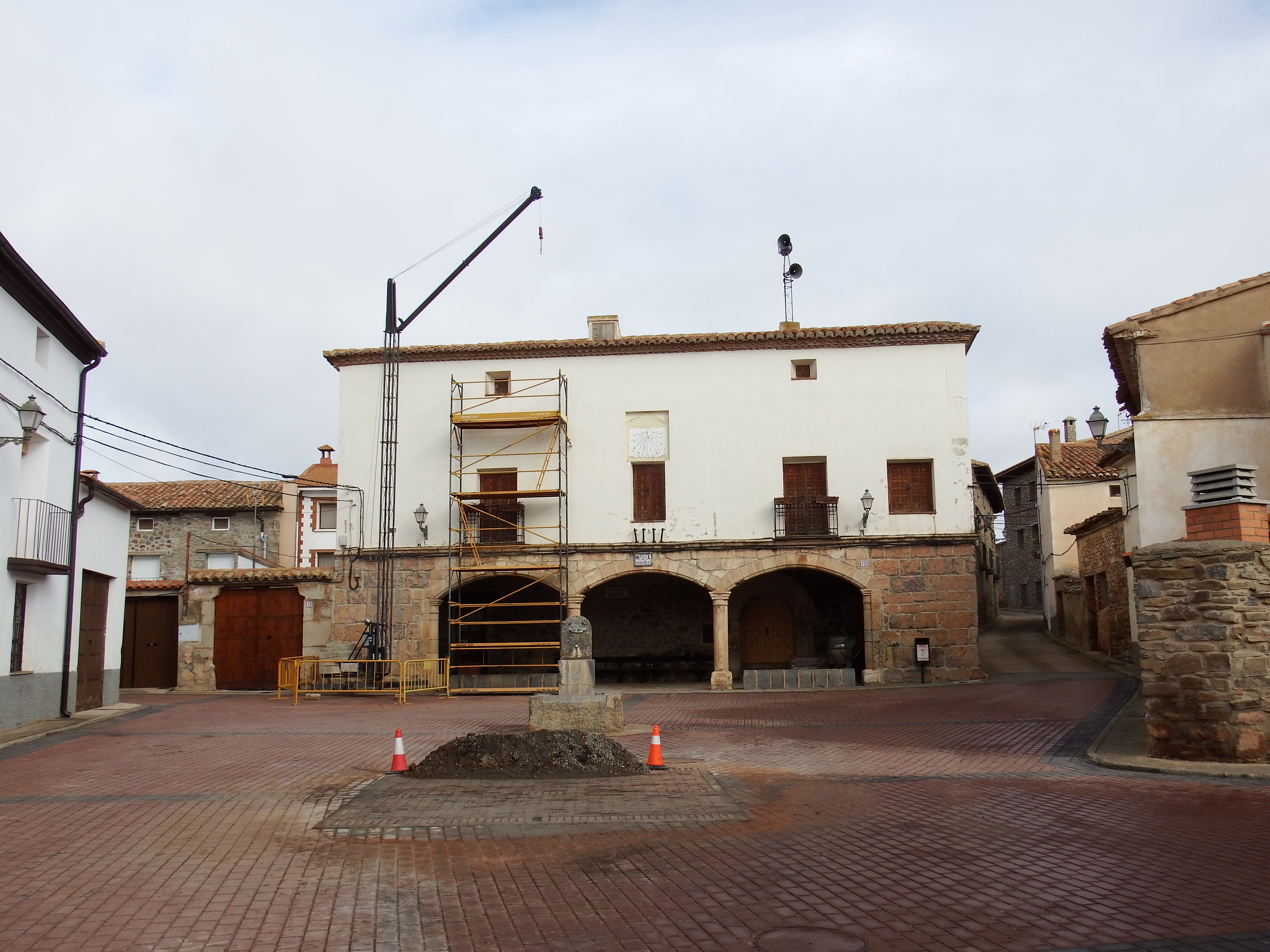
- Town hall

- Flag Coat of arms

- Location within Spain
- Coordinates: 40°43′N 1°7′W
- Country: Spain
- Autonomous community: Aragon
- Province: Teruel
- Comarca: Comunidad de Teruel

Area
  - Total: 40 km^{2} (15 sq mi)
- Elevation: 1,211 m (3,973 ft)

Population (2025-01-01)
  - Total: 56
  - Density: 1.4/km^{2} (3.6/sq mi)
- Time zone: UTC+1 (CET)
  - Summer (DST): UTC+2 (CEST)

Lidón is a municipality located in the province of Teruel, Aragon, Spain. According to the 2010 census the municipality has a population of 57 inhabitants.

== See also ==
- Comunidad de Teruel
- List of municipalities in Teruel
