= Alba, Aragon =

Alba
- Location within Spain
- Coordinates: 40°36′N 1°21′W
- Country: Spain
- Autonomous community: Aragon
- Province: Teruel
- Comarca: Comunidad de Teruel

Area
  - Total: 70.5 km^{2} (27.2 sq mi)
- Elevation: 974 m (3,196 ft)

Population (2025-01-01)
  - Total: 186
  - Density: 2.64/km^{2} (6.83/sq mi)
- Time zone: UTC+1 (CET)
  - Summer (DST): UTC+2 (CEST)

Alba (also called Alba del Campo) is a municipality located in the province of Teruel, Aragon, Spain. According to the 2018 census the municipality had a population of 178 inhabitants. Its postal code is 44395.

It is located at high altitude near the Cerro de San Cristóbal, among the Sistema Ibérico mountains.

== See also ==
- Comunidad de Teruel
- List of municipalities in Teruel
