= Fuentes de Jiloca =

Fuentes de Jiloca, Spain
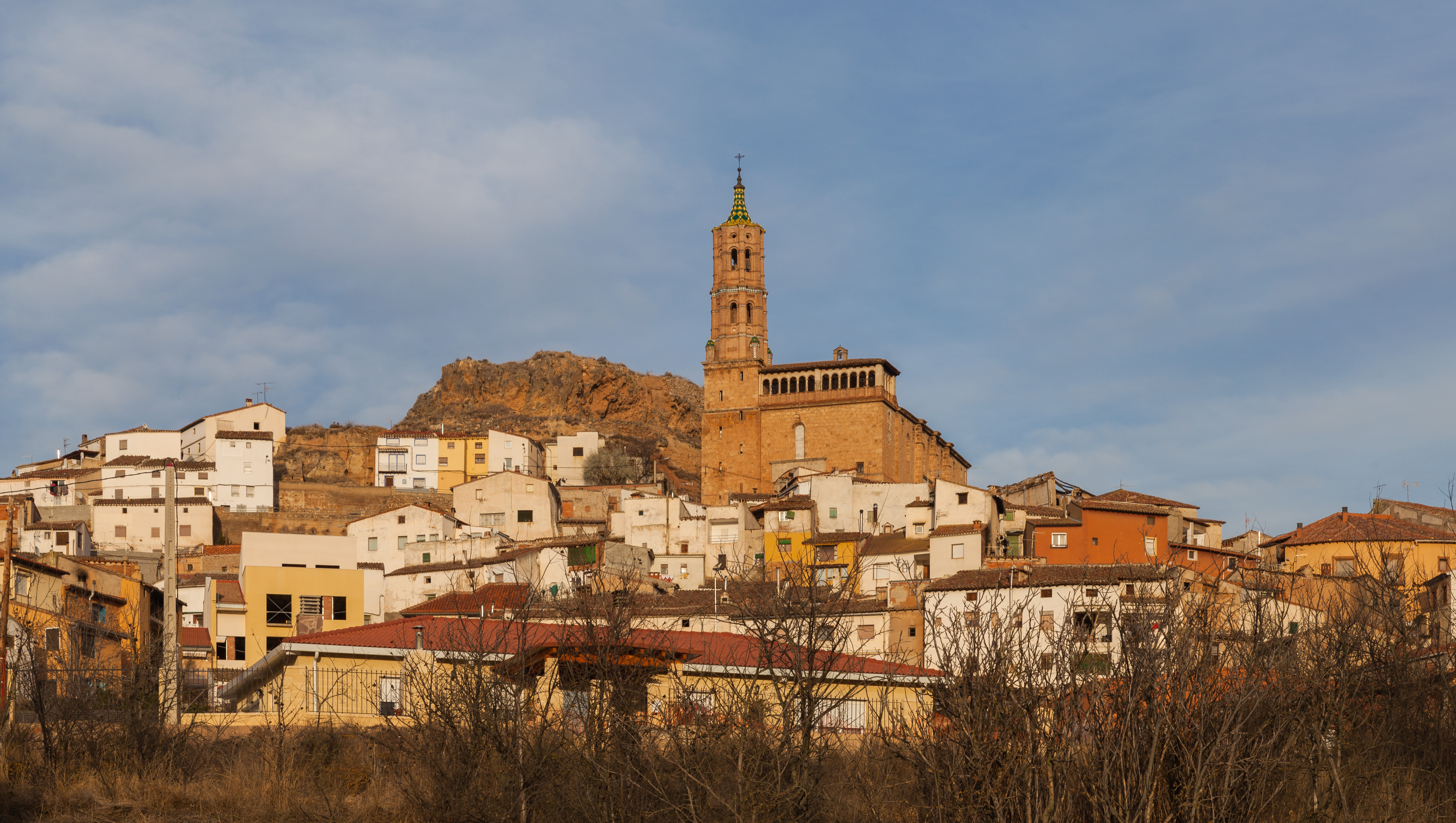

- Location within Aragon Location within Spain Location within Europe
- Coordinates: 41°14′N 1°32′W
- Country: Spain
- Autonomous community: Aragon
- Province: Zaragoza
- Municipality: Fuentes de Jiloca

Area
  - Total: 27 km^{2} (10 sq mi)

Population (2025-01-01)
  - Total: 209
  - Density: 7.7/km^{2} (20/sq mi)
- Time zone: UTC+1 (CET)
  - Summer (DST): UTC+2 (CEST)

Fuentes de Jiloca (Aragonese: Fuents de Xiloca) is a municipality on the river Jiloca, located in the province of Zaragoza, Aragon, Spain. According to the 2004 census (INE), the municipality has a population of 308 inhabitants.

== See also ==
- List of municipalities in Zaragoza
