= El Cañizar lake =

Former extensive freshwater wetland at the bottom of the Jiloca graben

Coordinates: 40°30′09″N 1°17′13″W

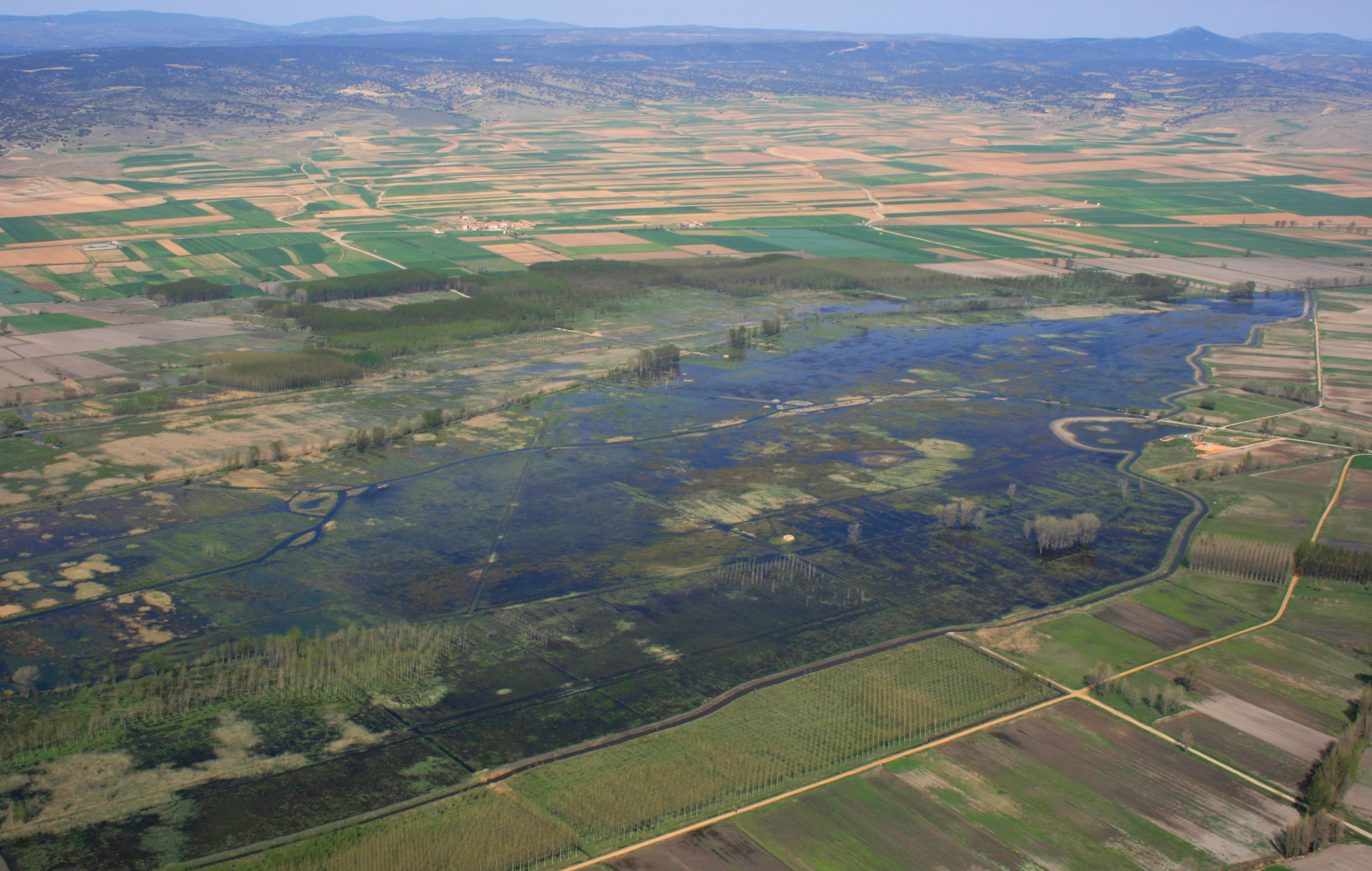
Aerial view of the Cañizar lagoon in 2010.

The former El Cañizar lake (Spanish: Laguna del Cañizar) was an extensive freshwater wetland located at the bottom of the Jiloca tectonic trench next to the town of Villarquemado, Spain. Its waters covered part of the municipalities of Cella, Santa Eulalia del Campo and Villarquemado, all of them belonging to the Comarca de la Comunidad de Teruel, Province of Teruel, Autonomous Community of Aragón. Before being drained at the beginning of the 18th century, its waters covered 1130 ha with a maximum depth of 2.8 meters and a stored water volume of 18.7 hm^{3}.

Between 1729 and 1732 the definitive drainage works of the wetland were carried out. These actions, directed by the Italian military engineer Domingo Ferrari, meant the total disappearance of the lagoon. As time passed, the main drainage, known as Acequia Madre, came to be considered as just another stretch of the Jiloca river and the existence of the Cañizar was forgotten. By the end of the 20th century, almost all of its riverbed had been ploughed up for agricultural use.

Since the beginning of this century, a project for the recovery of this wetland has been underway. Currently, 380 ha of floodable areas have already been recovered, making the new Cañizar the largest freshwater lagoon in inland Spain. In 2010, more than 200 species of aquatic birds were recorded, some of them in serious danger of extinction, such as the bittern (botaurus stellaris) or the squacco heron (ardeola ralloides).

== History ==
Ignacio Jordán Claudio de Asso y del Río mentions it in his book "Historia de la Economía Política de Aragón" (1798):

The land is at stretches flabby, and spongy; and in some parts so deep, that not finding descent the waters, they are detained forming ponds, or very extensive lagoons, as seen in the Ermajal de Villarquemado with serious damage to the health of its neighbors. The natives could take advantage of the peat, or vegetal earth, and fuel, that is with abundance in these places. That of Caudete is the best that I have seen, and the most similar to the peat of Holland, because it boils with the acids, and leaves a white ash.

== Bibliography ==
- José Carlos Rubio Dobón. (2004). Contexto hidrogeológico e histórico de los humedales del Cañizar (in Spanish). Publicaciones del Consejo de Protección de la Naturaleza en Aragón. Serie investigación, 2004.
- José Carlos Rubio Dobón. (2002). Las lagunas perdidas del Alto Jiloca; el mayor humedal de Aragón (in Spanish). Editorial Tirwal.
