= Velilla de Jiloca =

Coordinates: 41°17′N 1°36′W

- municipality
- Flag Coat of arms

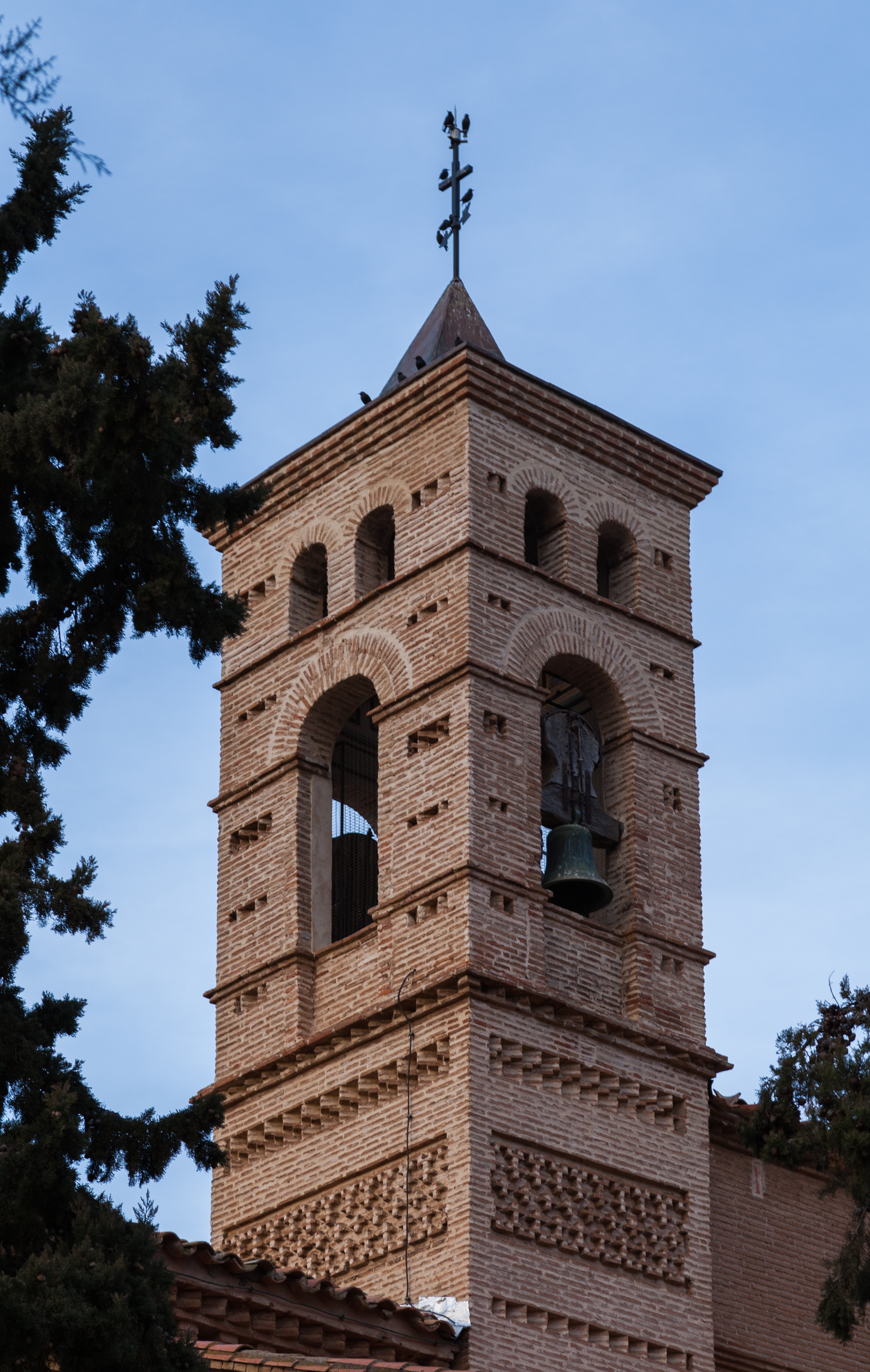
- Country: Spain
- Autonomous community: Aragon
- Province: Zaragoza

Area
  - Total: 10 km^{2} (3.9 sq mi)

Population (2025-01-01)
  - Total: 90
  - Density: 9.0/km^{2} (23/sq mi)
- Time zone: UTC+1 (CET)
  - Summer (DST): UTC+2 (CEST)

Velilla de Jiloca is a municipality on the river Jiloca, located in the province of Zaragoza, Aragon, Spain. According to the 2008 census (INE), the municipality has a population of 108 inhabitants.

== See also ==
- List of municipalities in Zaragoza
