= Cedrillas =

- Municipality
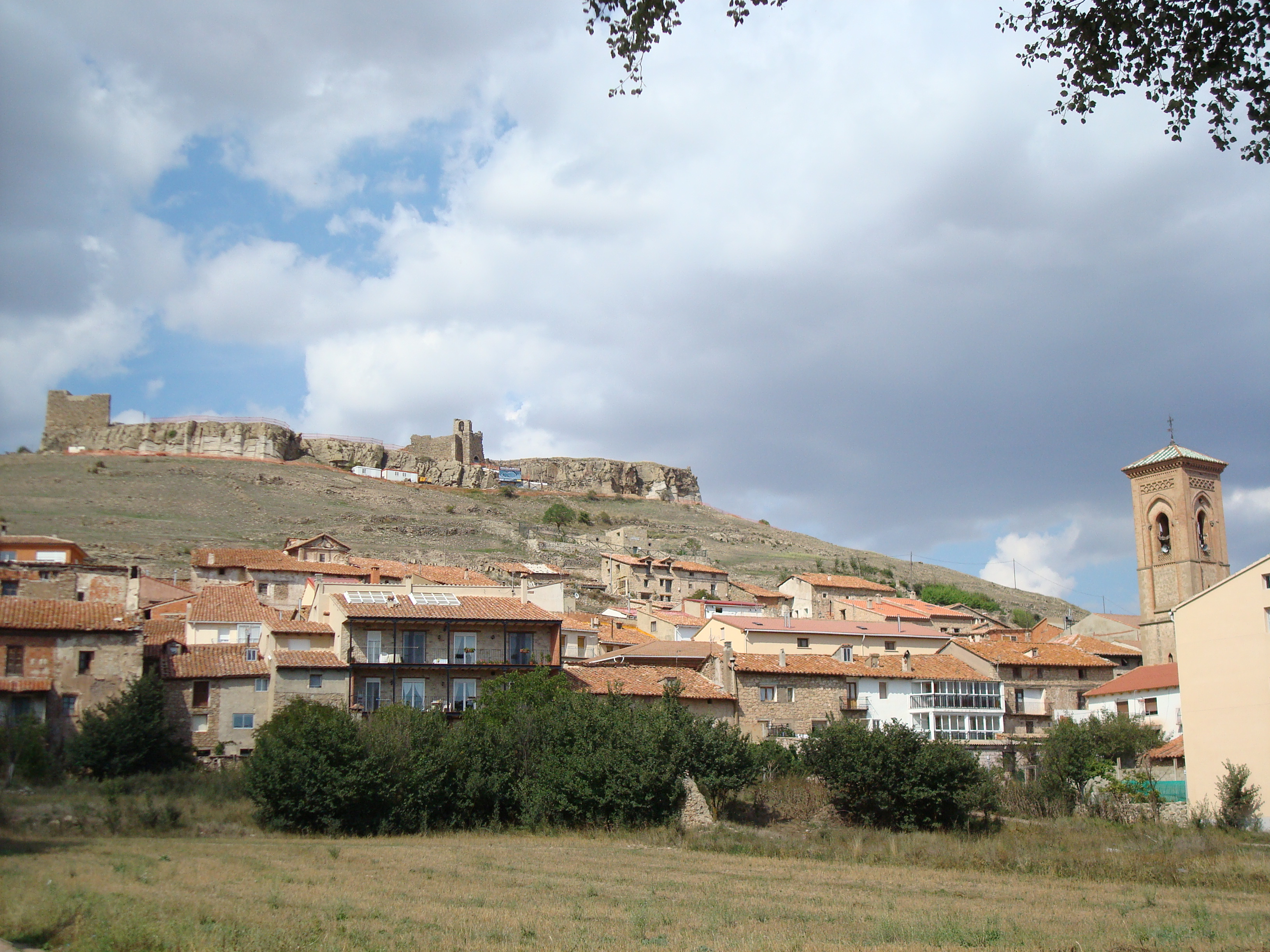

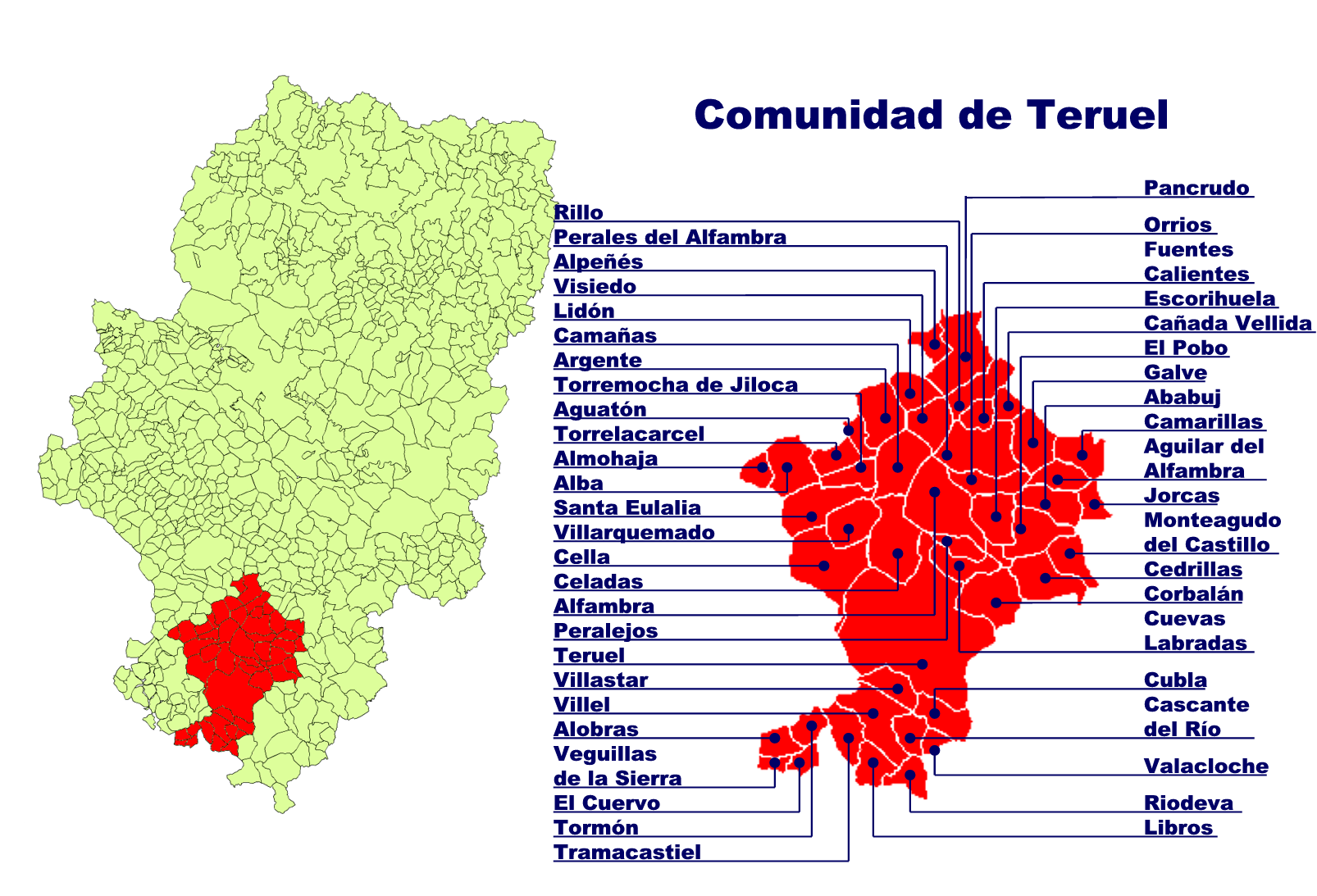

- Location in Spain
- Coordinates: 40°26.2′N 0°51.2′W
- Country: Spain
- Autonomous community: Aragón
- Province: Teruel
- Comarca: Comunidad de Teruel
- Judicial district: Teruel

Government
  - Alcalde: José Luis López Sáez (2007) (PSOE)

Area
  - Total: 73.57 km^{2} (28.41 sq mi)
- Elevation: 1,364 m (4,475 ft)

Population (2025-01-01)
  - Total: 652
  - Density: 8.86/km^{2} (23.0/sq mi)
- Demonym: Cedrillense
- Time zone: UTC+1 (CET)
  - Summer (DST): UTC+2 (CEST)
- Postal code: 44147

Cedrillas is a municipality located in the province of Teruel, Aragon, Spain. According to the 2018 census (INE), the municipality has a population of 630 inhabitants.

== Demography ==
Population trend
1900	1910	1920	1930	1940	1950	1960	1970	1981	1991	2000	2005
860	910	903	891	832	956	886	652	569	507	527	542

== See also ==
- List of municipalities in Teruel
