= Cubla =

Cubla, Spain
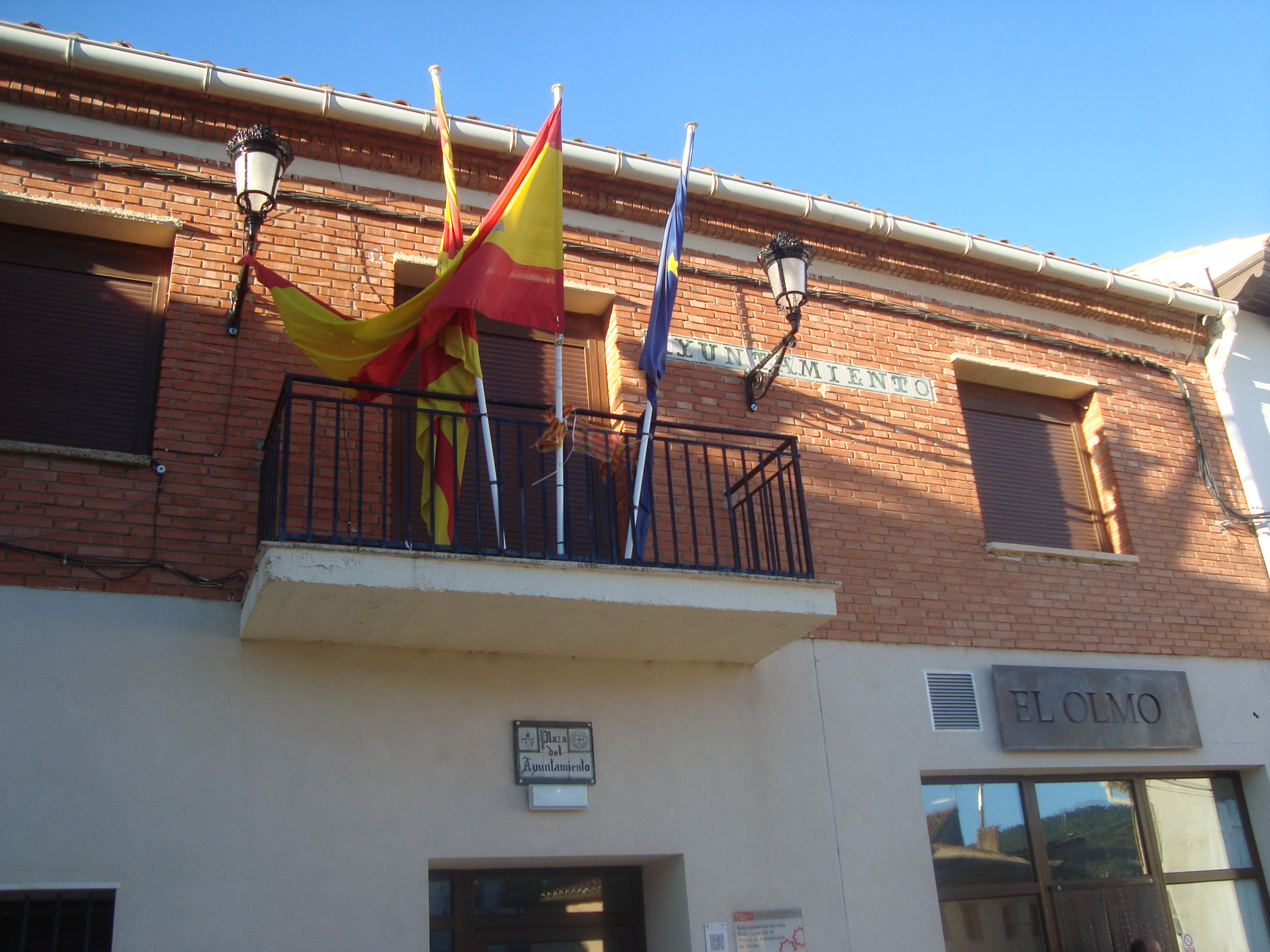
- Town hall

- Coat of arms

- Location within Spain
- Coordinates: 40°13′N 1°4′W
- Country: Spain
- Autonomous community: Aragon
- Province: Teruel
- Comarca/District: Comunidad de Teruel
- Municipality: Cubla

Area
  - Total: 48 km^{2} (19 sq mi)
- Elevation: 1,088 m (3,570 ft)

Population (2025-01-01)
  - Total: 56
  - Density: 1.2/km^{2} (3.0/sq mi)
- Time zone: UTC+1 (CET)
  - Summer (DST): UTC+2 (CEST)

Cubla is a municipality located in the province of Teruel, Aragon, Spain. It is 18 km from the provincial capital, Teruel. According to the 2004 census (INE), the municipality has a population of 47 inhabitants. However more recent data suggested that the village had a population of 58 inhabitants in 2008.

In 2011 mayor Santiago was replaced by Angeles Gómez Navarro, first female mayor in Cubla, who is Jose Luis' wife and the daughter in law of former 1980s legendary mayor Bautista, starting a new political period and new challenges. Former mayors of Cubla: Bautista (1980s), Manuel (also known Manuel Parreta) (1990s), Santiago (better known as Santiaguin).

== See also ==
- List of municipalities in Teruel
