= Valacloche =

- municipality
- Coat of arms

- Location within Spain
- Coordinates: 40°11′N 1°5′W
- Country: Spain
- Autonomous community: Aragon
- Province: Teruel

Area
  - Total: 14 km^{2} (5.4 sq mi)
- Elevation: 985 m (3,232 ft)

Population (2025-01-01)
  - Total: 33
  - Density: 2.4/km^{2} (6.1/sq mi)
- Time zone: UTC+1 (CET)
  - Summer (DST): UTC+2 (CEST)

Valacloche is a municipality located in the province of Teruel, Aragon, Spain. According to the 2004 census (INE), the municipality has a population of 23 inhabitants.

The name of Valacloche comes from Latin "Vallis Clavssa" that translates into English as "closed valley".

This town is located at the feet of the Sierra de Javalambre, Sistema Ibérico.

The citizens who live there are called "valaclochenses".

== See also ==
- List of municipalities in Teruel
