= Riodeva =

- municipality
- Location within Spain
- Coordinates: 40°07′N 1°09′W
- Country: Spain
- Autonomous community: Aragon
- Province: Teruel
- Municipality: Riodeva

Area
  - Total: 34.34 km^{2} (13.26 sq mi)

Population (2025-01-01)
  - Total: 113
  - Density: 3.29/km^{2} (8.52/sq mi)
- Time zone: UTC+1 (CET)
  - Summer (DST): UTC+2 (CEST)

Riodeva is a municipality located in the province of Teruel, Aragon, Spain. According to the 2004 census (INE), the municipality had a population of 191 inhabitants.

== See also ==
- List of municipalities in Teruel
