= Pancrudo =

- Location within Aragon Location within Spain
- Coordinates: 40°46′N 1°2′W
- Country: Spain
- Autonomous community: Aragon
- Province: Teruel
- Comarca: Comunidad de Teruel

Area
  - Total: 100.12 km^{2} (38.66 sq mi)
- Elevation: 1,235 m (4,052 ft)

Population (2025-01-01)
  - Total: 118
  - Density: 1.18/km^{2} (3.05/sq mi)
- Time zone: UTC+1 (CET)
  - Summer (DST): UTC+2 (CEST)

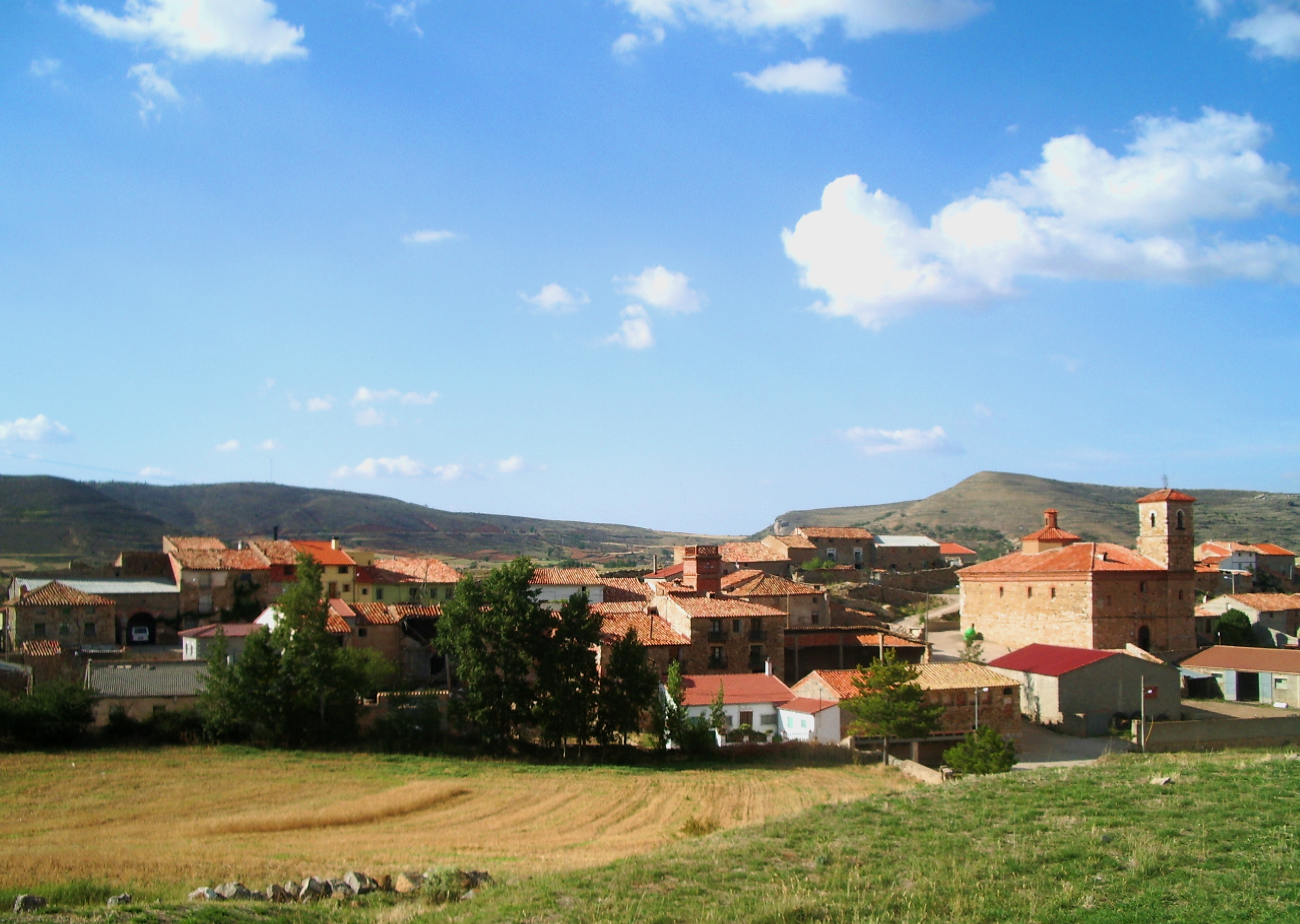
View of Portalrubio, a village within Pancrudo municipal term

Pancrudo is a municipality in the Teruel Community comarca, Teruel province, Aragon, Spain. According to the 2010 census the municipality had a population of 136 inhabitants. Its postal code is 44720. Its distance from the provincial capital, Teruel is 56 kilometres.

The mayor of Pancrudo is Mr. Manuel Tolosa Sancho, of the ruling Partido Socialista Obrero Español. This party has 3 municipal councillors in the town's ayuntamiento, while the Partido Aragonés holds the remaining 2. In the 2004 Spanish General Election the Partido Socialista Obrero Español got 46.2% of the vote in Pancrudo, the Partido Popular got 43.0%, the Partido Aragonés got 4.3%, the Chunta Aragonesista, 3.2% and Izquierda Unida, 2.2%.

It is located at high altitude among the Sistema Ibérico mountains.

== Villages ==
- Pancrudo
- Cervera de Pancrudo
- Cuevas de Portalrubio
- Portalrubio

== See also ==
- Comunidad de Teruel
- List of municipalities in Teruel
