= Vall de Núria (ski resort) =

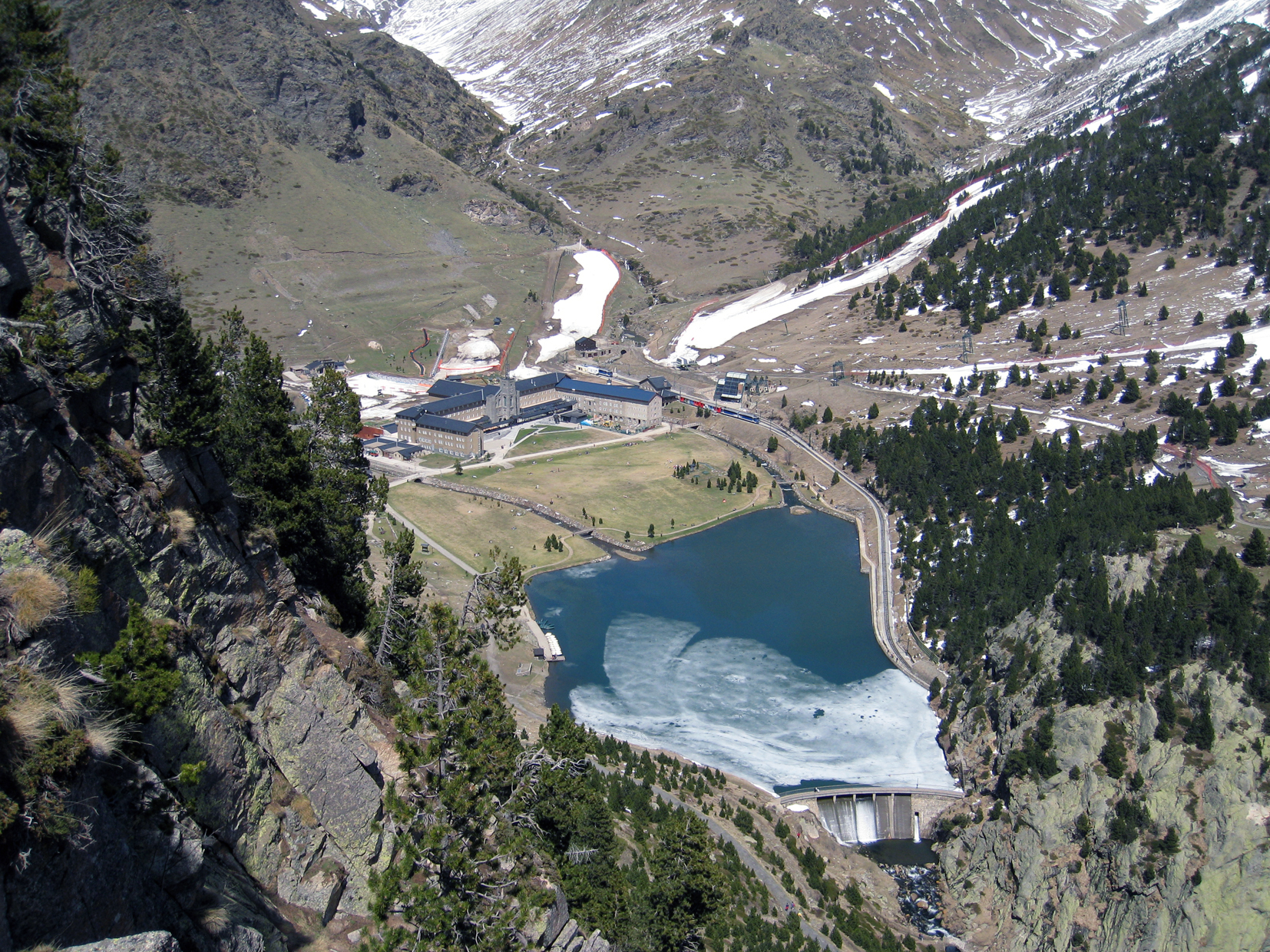
- Interactive map of Vall de Núria
- Location: Núria valley
- Nearest city: Queralbs, Catalonia
- Coordinates: 42°23′54″N 2°9′10″E
- Top elevation: 2,252 m (7,388 ft)
- Base elevation: 1,964 m (6,444 ft)
- Trails: Black: 2 Red: 3 Blue: 2 Green: 3; 10 Total (6,9 km)
- Longest run: 1,752
- Lift system: 4 Total (1 Chairlift, 2 Platter lift, 1 Gondola lift)
- Lift capacity: 4,100 skiers an hour
- Terrain parks: Snowpark
- Website: website

Vall de Núria is a ski resort located in the Núria valley, in Catalonia. The ski area extends from 1,964 to 2,252 metres.

The resort has a total of ten alpine ski trails (three green, three blue, two red and two black) and a special track for sleds. In total, seven km of marked trails. In the summer of 2006 there were 18 new snow cannons installed. A total of 73 snow cannons supplement natural snow cover.

About lifts, the resort has a four-seater chairlift fixed-grip (going from the lowest elevation, 1,964 m, to the highest, 2,252), a cable in the Coma del Clot that allows access to the hostel of the Pic de l'Àliga and two lifts that serve the beginners' area.
