= Villanueva de Jiloca =

Coordinates: 41°05′N 1°23′W

- municipality
- Coat of arms
- Interactive map of Villanueva de Jiloca
- Country: Spain
- Autonomous community: Aragon
- Province: Zaragoza

Area
  - Total: 7 km^{2} (2.7 sq mi)

Population (2025-01-01)
  - Total: 73
  - Density: 10/km^{2} (27/sq mi)
- Time zone: UTC+1 (CET)
  - Summer (DST): UTC+2 (CEST)

Villanueva de Jiloca is a municipality on the river Jiloca, located in the province of Zaragoza, Aragon, Spain. According to the 2012 census (INE), the municipality has a population of 60 inhabitants.

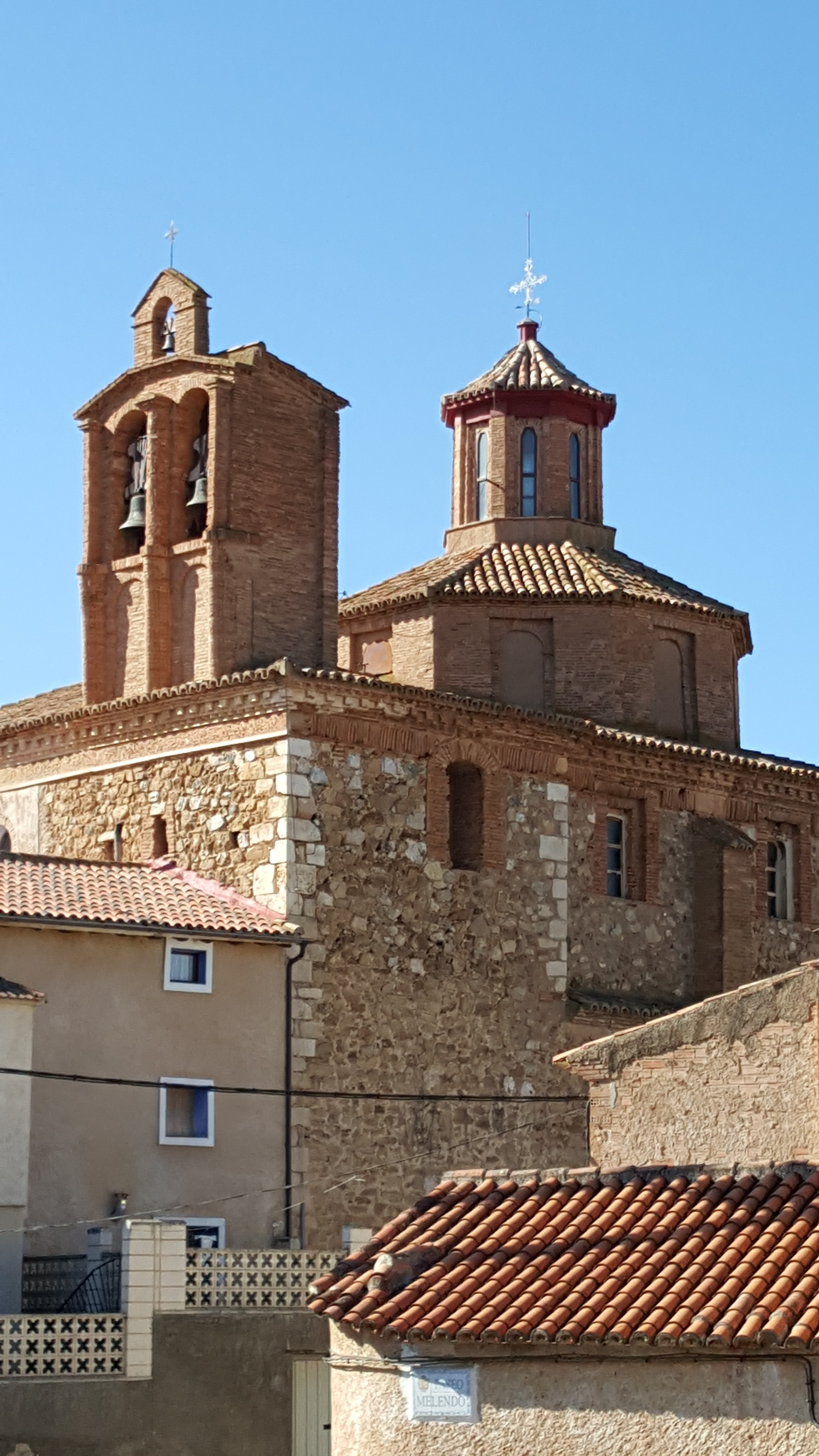
Church of San Gil, Villanueva de Jiloca, Zaragoza, Spain

== See also ==
- List of municipalities in Zaragoza
