= Torremocha de Jiloca =

Torremocha de Jiloca, Spain
- municipality
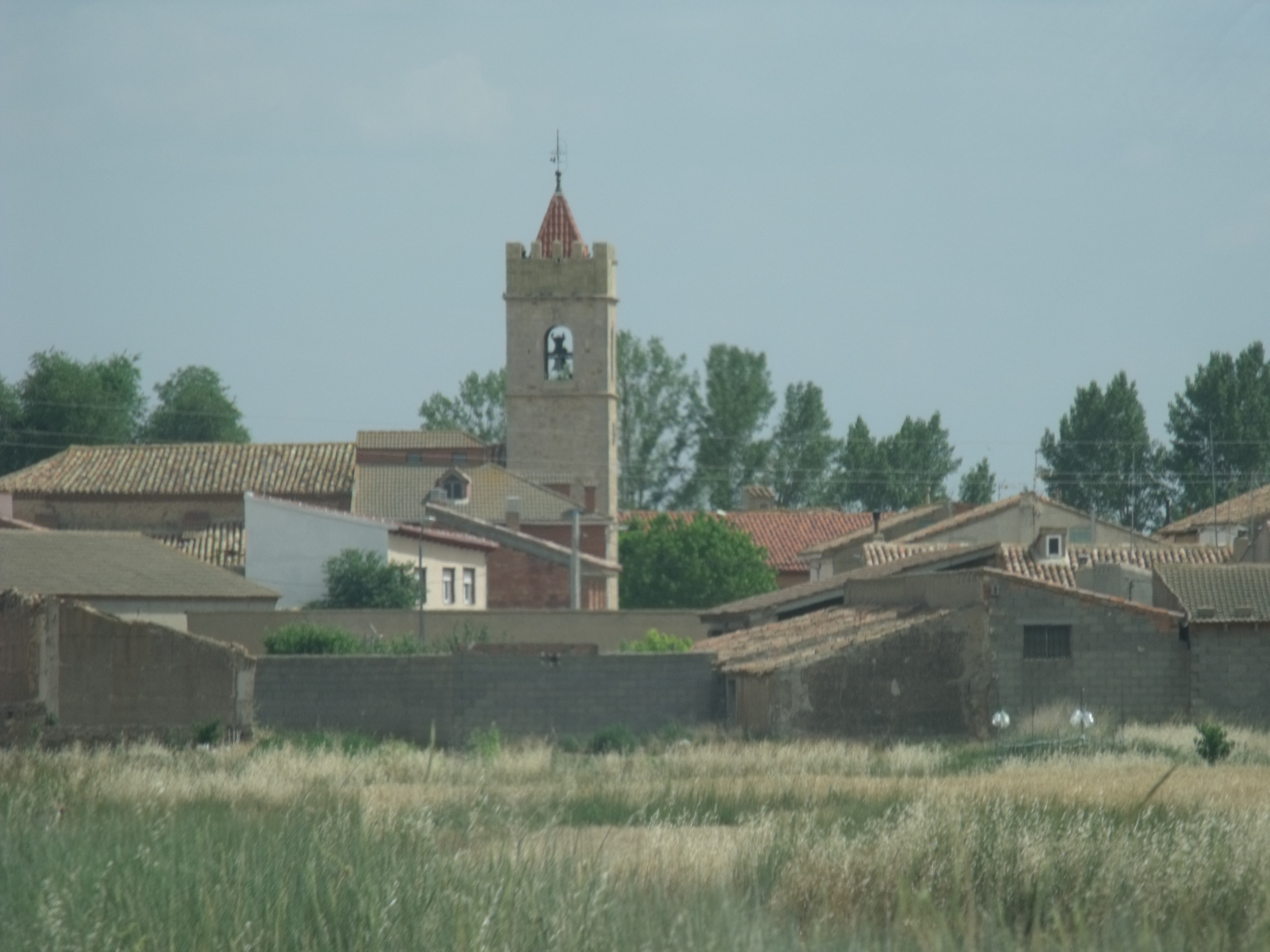

- Coat of arms

- Location within Spain
- Coordinates: 40°36′N 1°18′W
- Country: Spain
- Autonomous community: Aragon
- Province: Teruel
- Municipality: Torremocha de Jiloca

Area
  - Total: 33 km^{2} (13 sq mi)
- Elevation: 981 m (3,219 ft)

Population (2025-01-01)
  - Total: 115
  - Density: 3.5/km^{2} (9.0/sq mi)
- Time zone: UTC+1 (CET)
  - Summer (DST): UTC+2 (CEST)

Torremocha de Jiloca is a municipality on the river Jiloca, located in the province of Teruel, Aragon, Spain. According to the 2004 census (INE), the municipality has a population of 158 inhabitants. On January 12, 2021, a minimum temperature of −26.5 °C (−15.7 °F) was registered.

== See also ==
- List of municipalities in Teruel
