= Cella, Aragon =

Cella
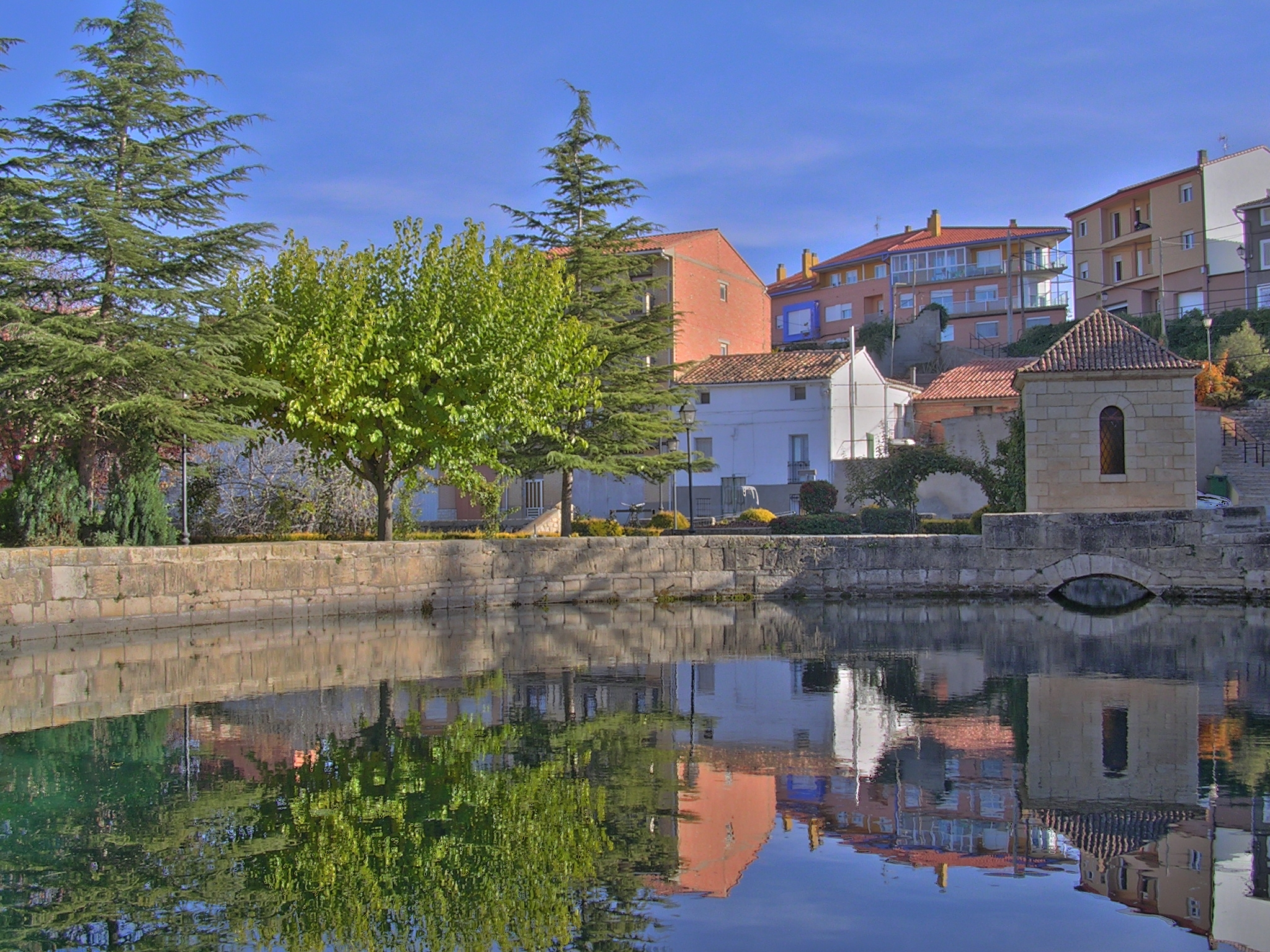

- Coat of arms

- Location within Spain
- Coordinates: 40°27′8″N 1°16′54″W
- Country: Spain
- Autonomous community: Aragon
- Province: Teruel
- Municipality: Cella

Government
  - Mayor: Joaquín Clemente Gascón (PSOE) (2015–2019)

Area
  - Total: 124.68 km^{2} (48.14 sq mi)
- Elevation: 1,023 m (3,356 ft)

Population (2025-01-01)
  - Total: 2,702
  - Density: 21.67/km^{2} (56.13/sq mi)
- Demonym: Cellano
- Time zone: UTC+1 (CET)
  - Summer (DST): UTC+2 (CEST)

Cella is a municipality in the province of Teruel, Aragon, Spain. In 2018 it had a population of 2,606 inhabitants.

== See also ==
- El Cañizar lake
- List of municipalities in Teruel
