= Villarquemado =

Villarquemado, Spain
- municipality
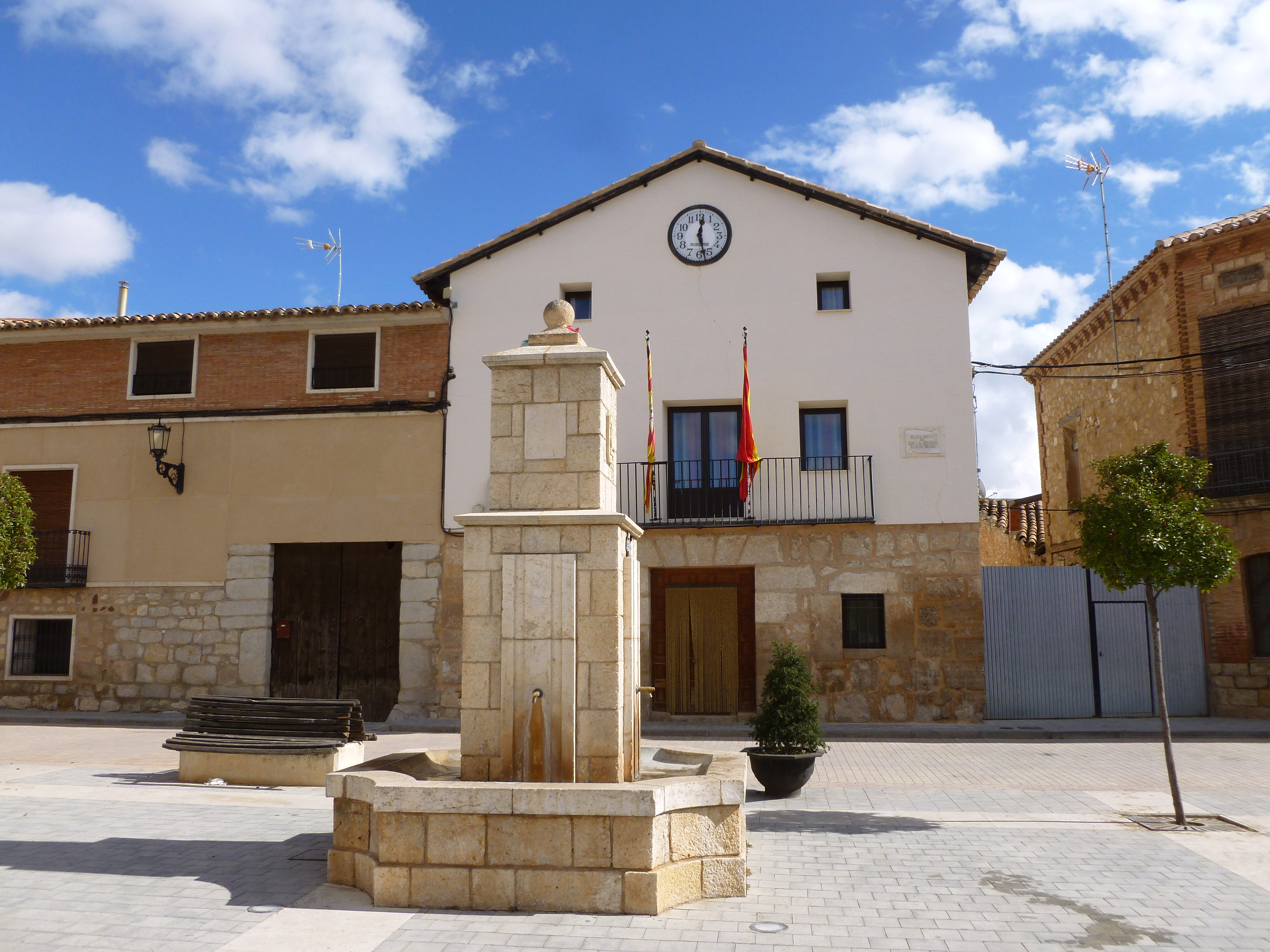
- Town hall

- Flag Coat of arms

- Location within Spain
- Coordinates: 40°31′N 1°16′W
- Country: Spain
- Autonomous community: Aragon
- Province: Teruel

Area
  - Total: 56.43 km^{2} (21.79 sq mi)
- Elevation: 996 m (3,268 ft)

Population (2025-01-01)
  - Total: 901
  - Density: 16.0/km^{2} (41.4/sq mi)
- Time zone: UTC+1 (CET)
  - Summer (DST): UTC+2 (CEST)

Villarquemado is a municipality located in the province of Teruel, Aragon, Spain. According to the 2004 census (INE), the municipality had a population of 938 inhabitants. It is located 24 km (15 mi) from the capital, Teruel. It covers 56.43 km^{2} and its population density is 16.66 inhabitants / km^{2}.

== See also ==
- El Cañizar lake
- List of municipalities in Teruel
