= Bescós de Garcipollera =

Settlement in province of Huesca, Aragon, Spain

Coordinates: 42°37′38″N 0°30′14″W

- Settlement
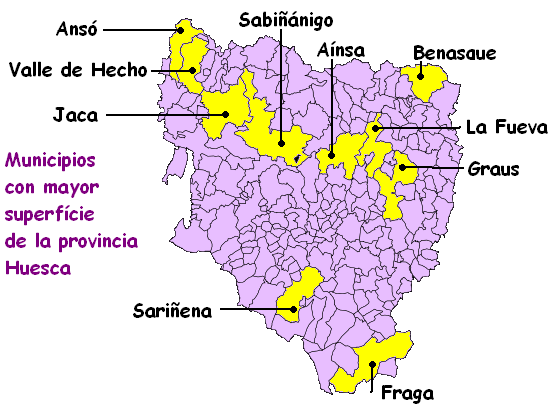
- Interactive map of Bescós de Garcipollera
- Country: Spain
- Autonomous community: Aragon
- Province: Huesca
- Comarca: Jacetania
- Municipality: Jaca
- Elevation: 929 m (3,048 ft)

Population
  - Total: 5 (INE 2,019)
- Postal code: 22710

Bescós de Garcipollera or Bescós de la Garcipollera is a Spanish settlement belonging to the municipality of Jaca, in the Jacetania, province of Huesca, Aragon. It is located in the valley of the Garcipollera.

== Geography ==
It is located in the lower part of the valley of the Ijuez river, in the valley of the Garcipollera.

== Etymology ==
For Manuel Benito Moliner, from the Instituto de Estudios Altoaragoneses, there are four possible etymologies or explanations for the origin of the toponym: firstly, it could be an anthroponym, that is, a toponym derived from a name or anthroponym, which in this case would be that of the holder of the estate or fundus, a Viscus in Latin; the second possibility would be to relate it to the word forest (bosque); the third, to derive it from osca, in the sense of land put under cultivation (which could fit with the late cultivation of the Garcipollera on the land of Bescós).

== History ==
It is estimated that it was around 1040-1050 when the Garcipollera was put under cultivation, at the initiative of Count Sancho Galíndez.

Around 1080, Garcipollera (and Bescós with it) became dependent on the monastery of San Juan de la Peña, forming part of a single priory.

Around 1200, most of the patrimony of this priory passed to King Peter II of Aragon, who founded a female monastery that shortly after moved to the monastery of Cambrón, in Sádaba (Cinco Villas), maintaining the ownership of several of the places in the Garcipollera.

At the beginning of the 17th century, however, the master of Garcipollera was Juan Abarca y Gurrea, and thus the ecclesiastical lordship in the area had disappeared.

Between 1859 and 1863, at a time of strong expansion of the arable land in the province of Huesca due to the phenomenon of the ploughing of communal mountains after the disentailment of Mendizábal, there is evidence of the sale at auction of several hills of Bescós.

In 1933 it became part of the medical district of Castiello de Jaca, where the doctor who attended to the residents of Bescós resided.

The village has been abandoned since the 1960s because both buildings and farmland were expropriated for the construction of the Yesa Reservoir on the Aragón river. Its forests were then planted with pine trees in an attempt to delay the filling of the reservoir basin with the materials carried by the erosion caused by rainfall. This erosion was increased due to the recent land clearing in the second half of the 19th century.

Thus, in 1961, by Royal Decree 2543/61, of December 7, published in the Official State Gazette number 303, of December 20, Bescós de Garcipollera ceased to exist as a municipal district, being absorbed by Jaca, where it currently belongs. Since that time, the ruins of Bescós have been the property of the State, although they were later transferred to the Government of Aragón.

A fish farm has been built next to the ruins of the old village.

== Demographics ==
=== Locality ===
Demographic data for the town of Bescós de Garcipollera in 1900:

Historical populations of Bescós de Garcipollera
Year	1900	1910	1920	1930	1940	1950	1960	1970	1981	1991	2001	2011	2019
Pop.	253	237	208	192	163	118	68	17	9	7	4	5	5
±%	—	−6.3%	−12.2%	−7.7%	−15.1%	−27.6%	−42.4%	−75.0%	−47.1%	−22.2%	−42.9%	+25.0%	+0.0%

- Data related to the de jure population.

=== Former municipality ===
Demographic data of the municipality of Bescós de Garcipollera since 1842:

Historical populations of the former municipality
Year	1842	1857	1860	1877	1887	1897	1900	1910	1920	1930	1940	1950	1960
Pop.	105	389	405	380	380	372	375	363	336	306	272	190	99
±%	—	+270.5%	+4.1%	−6.2%	+0.0%	−2.1%	+0.8%	−3.2%	−7.4%	−8.9%	−11.1%	−30.1%	−47.9%

- Between the 1857 Census and the previous one, the municipality grew because it incorporated Bergosa and Yosa de Garcipollera.
- Between the 1970 Census and the previous one, this municipality disappeared because it became part of the municipality of Jaca.
- Data refer to the de jure population, except in the 1857 and 1860 Censuses, which refer to the de facto population.

== Architectural heritage ==
The parish church of San Miguel stands out, with a Romanesque floor plan from the 12th century, although it underwent major reconstruction in the 17th or 18th centuries. It is currently in a state of ruin, since the abandonment of the town.

== Natural heritage ==
The Garcipollera valley, as a whole, has been declared a National Hunting Reserve, depending in these aspects on the Ministry of Agriculture. In 1962, the Reserve was repopulated with several specimens of deer.

== See also ==
- Villanovilla
- Larrosa
- Bergosa
- Acín
- Yosa de Garcipollera
- Cenarbe
