= La Garcipollera =

Valley in Jacetania, Huesca, Spain

Coordinates: 42°37′12″N 0°29′08″W

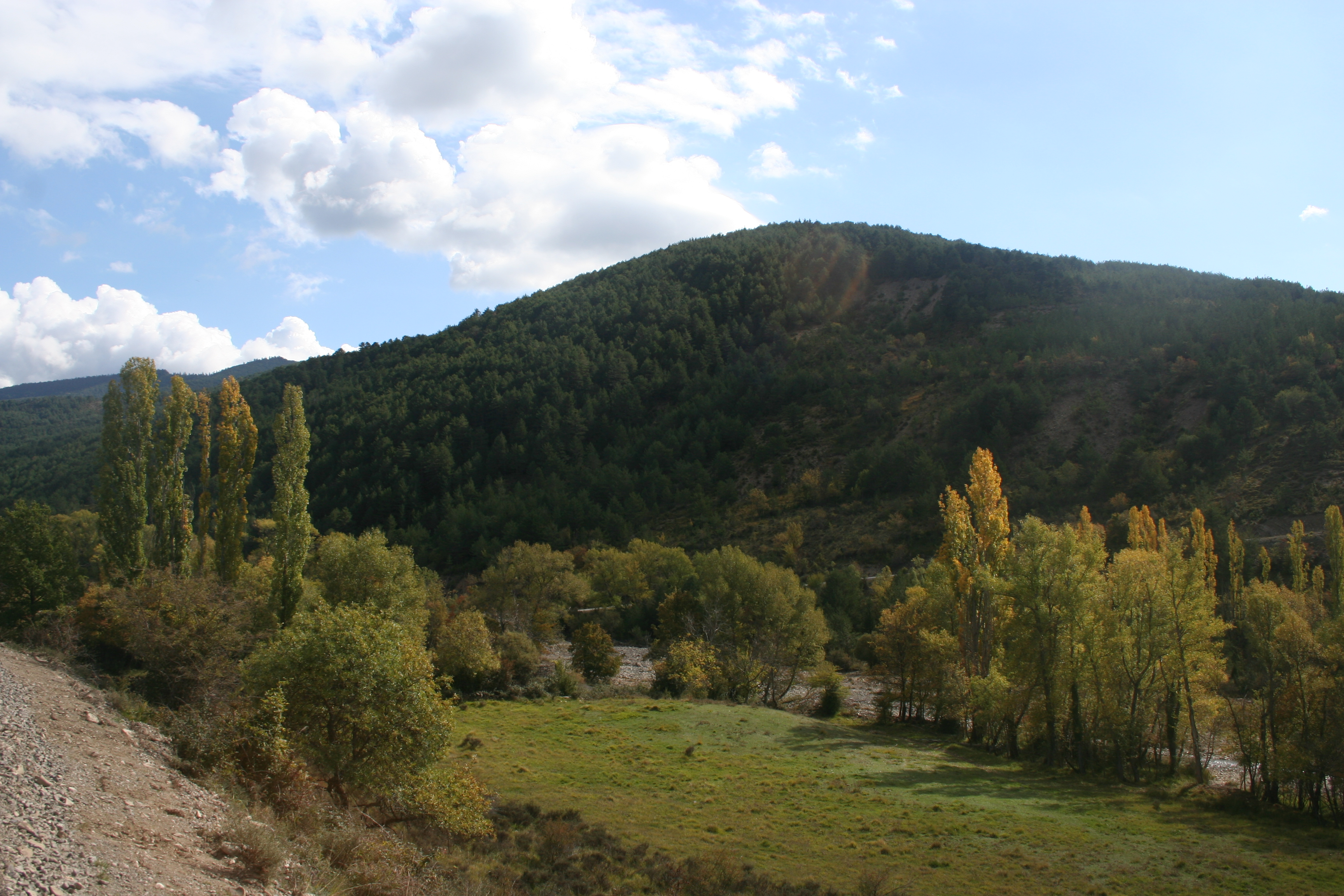
Landscape of the Garcipollera valley.

La Garcipollera (in Aragonese and officially A Garzipollera), also known as Garcipollera Valley, is a small area of the Aragonese Pyrenees, within the Jacetania, in the province of Huesca, practically coinciding with the basin of the Ijuez river, a tributary of Aragon. It is characteristic because most of its villages were depopulated during the 20th century.

== Geography ==
Located in the upper part of the Aragón river near Jaca and before the middle Pyrenean depression or Berdún Canal, in the basin of the Ijuez river and its surroundings, the valley comprises a space delimited by the foothills of the Collarada massif, the Acumuer valley and the Aragón river. Some sources consider it to be part of the Aragón valley, also known as the Canfranc valley.

== History ==
=== Ancient and Middle Ages ===
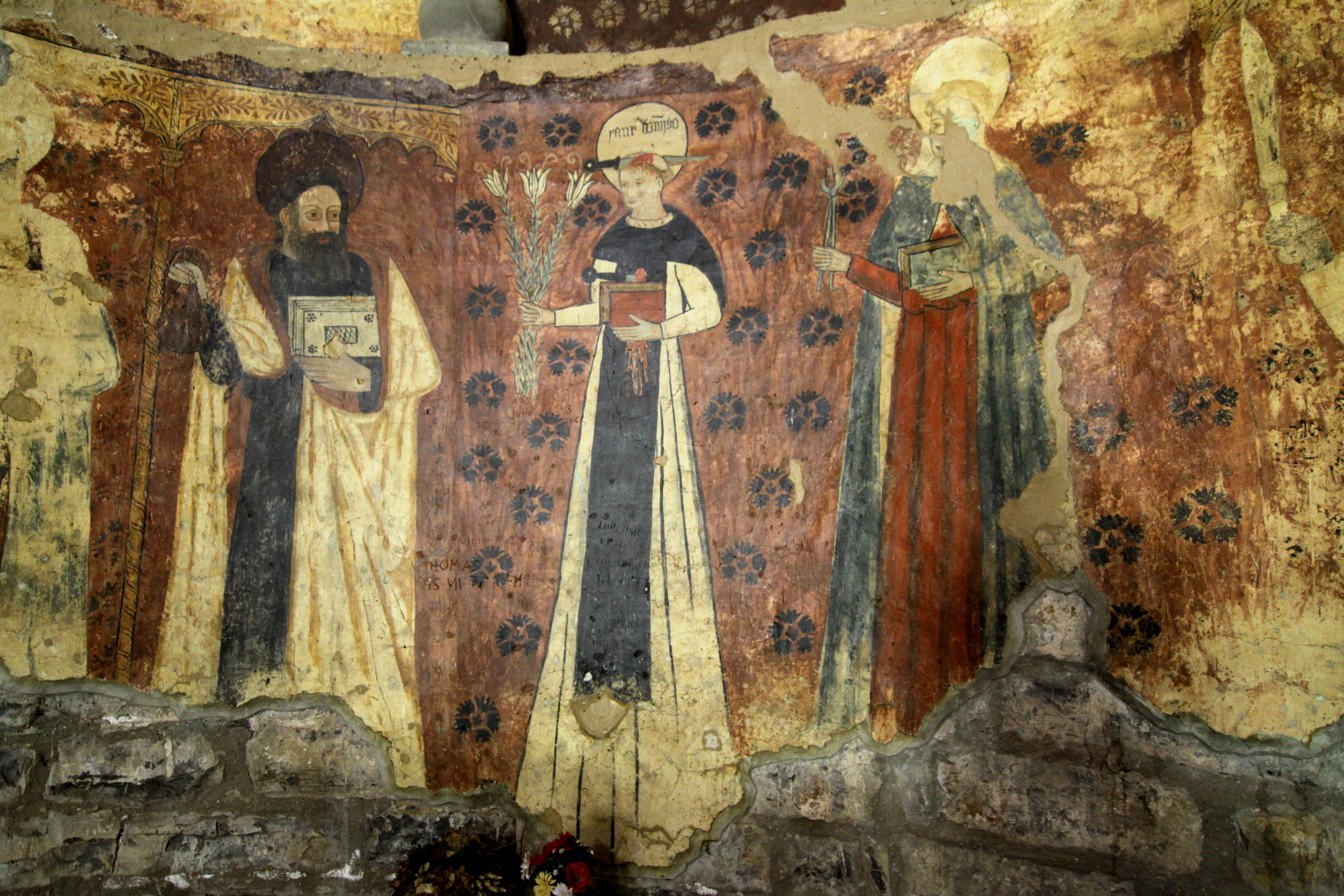
Detail of the paintings inside Santa María de Iguácel.

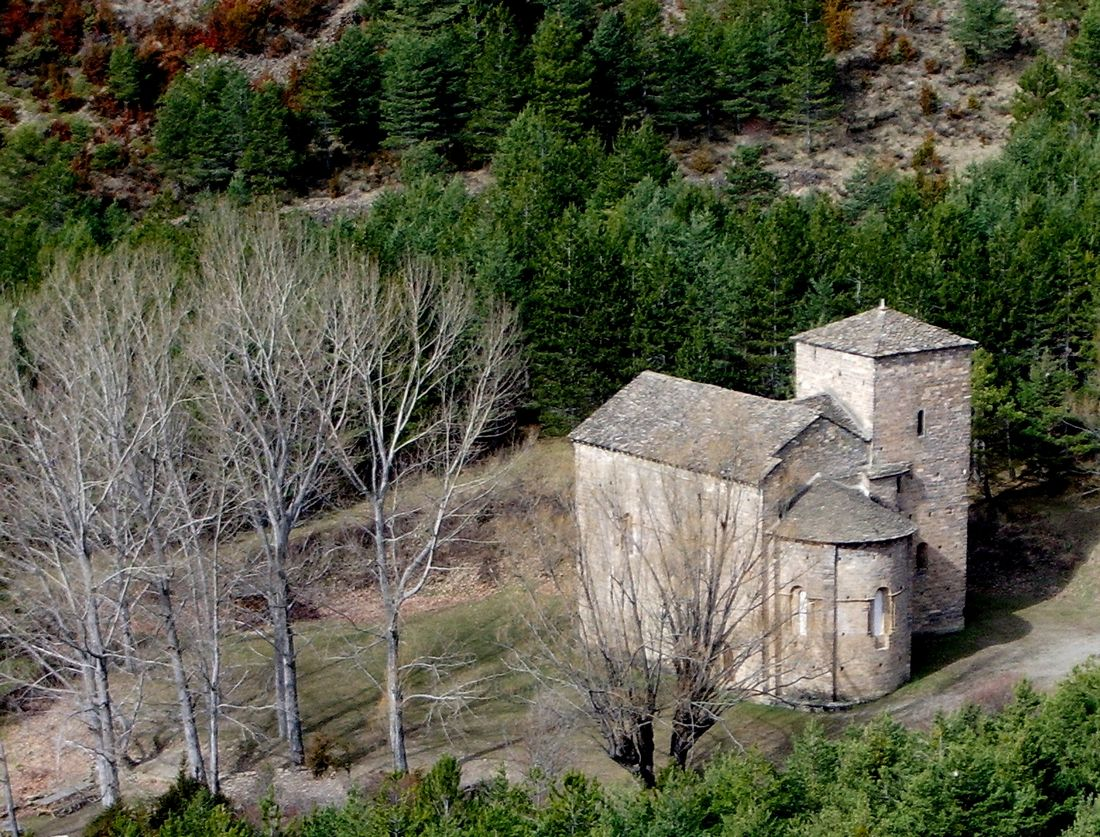
Exterior of the Monastery of Iguácel.

The first sources of the toponym are found in the Libro de la Cadena del Concejo de Jaca, referring to the valley as ualle cepollaria, which would derive to the forms Ual çepolaria and Barcipollera, until the current name Garcipollera in Castilian.

=== Modern and Contemporary Ages ===
In the second half of the 20th century, a large part of the valley was expropriated by the State Forestry Patrimony due to the construction of the Yesa Reservoir, which would require the reforestation of the Ijuez river basin to avoid the headward erosion that the reservoir would produce in the Aragón river and its tributaries.

== Cultural heritage ==
- Monastery of Santa María de Iguácel
- Church of San Juan Bautista de Acín

== Natural heritage ==
- Ijuez river

== Villages of the Garcipollera ==
- Acín
- Bergosa
- Bescós de Garcipollera
- Larrosa
- Villanovilla
- Yosa de Garcipollera
