= Acin =

Acin is a surname. Notable people with the surname include:

- Andrej Aćin (born 1972), Serbian director
- Ramón Acín (1888–1936), Spanish anarcho-syndicalist

Acin may also refer to Acín, an inhabited village in Jaca, in the province of Huesca, in Spain.

== See also ==
- Asociación de Cabildos Indígenas del Norte del Cauca, Colombian indigenous rights organization
- ac.in, second-level domain used for universities in India
