= Yosa de Garcipollera =

Inhabited village in Jacetania, Aragon, Spain

Coordinates: 42°37′51″N 0°30′47″W

- Inhabited village
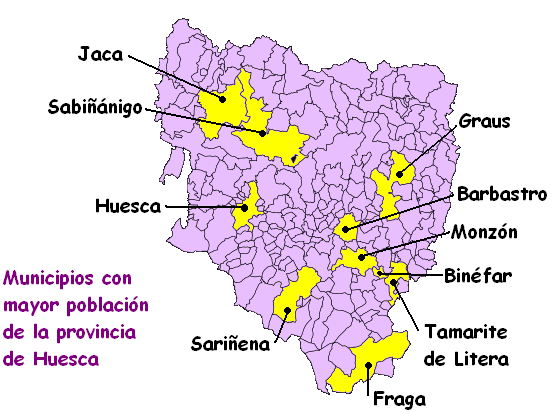
- Country: Spain
- Autonomous community: Aragon
- Province: Huesca
- Comarca: Jacetania
- Municipality: Jaca

Population
  - Total: 0

Yosa de Garcipollera is an abandoned town belonging to the municipality of Jaca, in the province of Huesca, in Spain. It is part of the Garcipollera Valley, in the region of Jacetania, in the autonomous community of Aragon.

== History ==
This village has no population, after having been expropriated in the 1960s for the construction of the Yesa Reservoir, with the intention of replanting it with pine trees to prevent the accumulation of sediments by the rains from accelerating the clogging of the newly built reservoir.

== Demographics ==
=== Locality ===
Demographic data of the town of Yosa de Garcipollera since 1900.

Historical populations of Yosa de Garcipollera
Year	1900	1910	1920	1930	1940	1950	1960	1970	1981	1991
Pop.	62	66	59	55	58	36	–	–	–	–
±%	—	+6.5%	−10.6%	−6.8%	+5.5%	−37.9%	—	—	—	—

- It has not been included in the Nomenclature since 1970.
- Data refer to the de jure population.

=== Former municipality ===
Demographic data of the municipality of Yosa de Garcipollera since 1842:

Historical populations of the former municipality
Year	1842	1857	1860	1877	1887	1897	1900	1910	1920	1930
Pop.	43	–	–	–	–	–	–	–	–	–
±%	—	—	—	—	—	—	—	—	—	—
Source: INE

- Between the 1857 Census and the previous one, this municipality disappeared because it was integrated into the municipality of Bescós de Garcipollera.
- Data refer to the de jure population, except in the 1857 and 1860 Censuses, which refer to the de facto population.

== See also ==
- Bescós de Garcipollera
- Larrosa
- Acín
- La Garcipollera
- Bergosa
