= Santa Cilia =

Santa Cilia (Spanish) Santa Zilia (Aragonese)
- Flag Coat of arms

- Location of Santa Cilia in Spain
- Coordinates: 42°33′38″N 0°42′52″W
- Country: Spain
- Autonomous community: Aragon
- Province: Huesca
- Comarca: Jacetania

Government
  - Mayor: Manuel Máñez Vivas

Area
  - Total: 28 km^{2} (11 sq mi)
- Elevation: 649 m (2,129 ft)

Population (2025-01-01)
  - Total: 244
  - Density: 8.7/km^{2} (23/sq mi)
- Time zone: UTC+1 (CET)
  - Summer (DST): UTC+2 (CEST)
- Website: Official website

Santa Cilia (in Aragonese: Santa Zilia) is a municipality located in Jacetania, province of Huesca, Aragon, Spain. It is 14 km from the town of Jaca between the River Aragon and the national highway N-240.

== History ==
Santa Cilia's history is linked to the Royal Monastery de San Juan de la Peña as far back as the 10th century. In 1336 "the town was deserted and destroyed by the instability, death and heavy burdens on its neighbours." At about the same time the present layout of the old town was created, consisting of a nearly six blocks, though its straight streets are reminiscent of a Roman camp.

The church was rebuilt, replacing a medieval church with the addition of a bell-tower in 1646. Walls to protect the church from flooding were added in the 18th century.

The old medieval bridge is now broken, but once stretched 160m with eight spans and was an important toll bridge over the River Aragon.

Santa Cilia became a municipality in 1834 and attained its greatest population in 1920 with 520 inhabitants and about 90 houses. However emigration, mainly to Argentina, France and Barcelona reduced its size to the present day level.

== Mayors ==
List of mayors
Years	Name	Political party
1979–1983	Santiago Mañez Vivas	
1983–1987	Domingo Ascaso Acín	
1987–1991	José Lalana Serrano	
1991–1995	Angel Ascaso Torralba	
1995–1999	Manuel Mañez Vivas	Chunta Aragonesista
1999–2003	Manuel Mañez Vivas	Chunta Aragonesista
2003–2007	Manuel Mañez Vivas	Chunta Aragonesista
2007–2011	Manuel Mañez Vivas	Chunta Aragonesista

== Demographic data ==
Population data for Santa Cilia between 1842 and 2007:

Historical population

Year	Pop.	±%
1842	291	—
1877	408	+40.2%
1887	434	+6.4%
1897	412	−5.1%
1900	484	+17.5%
1910	511	+5.6%
1920	506	−1.0%
1930	437	−13.6%

Year	Pop.	±%
1940	424	−3.0%
1950	431	+1.7%
1960	362	−16.0%
1970	253	−30.1%
1981	214	−15.4%
1991	158	−26.2%
2010	209	+32.3%

== Modern times ==
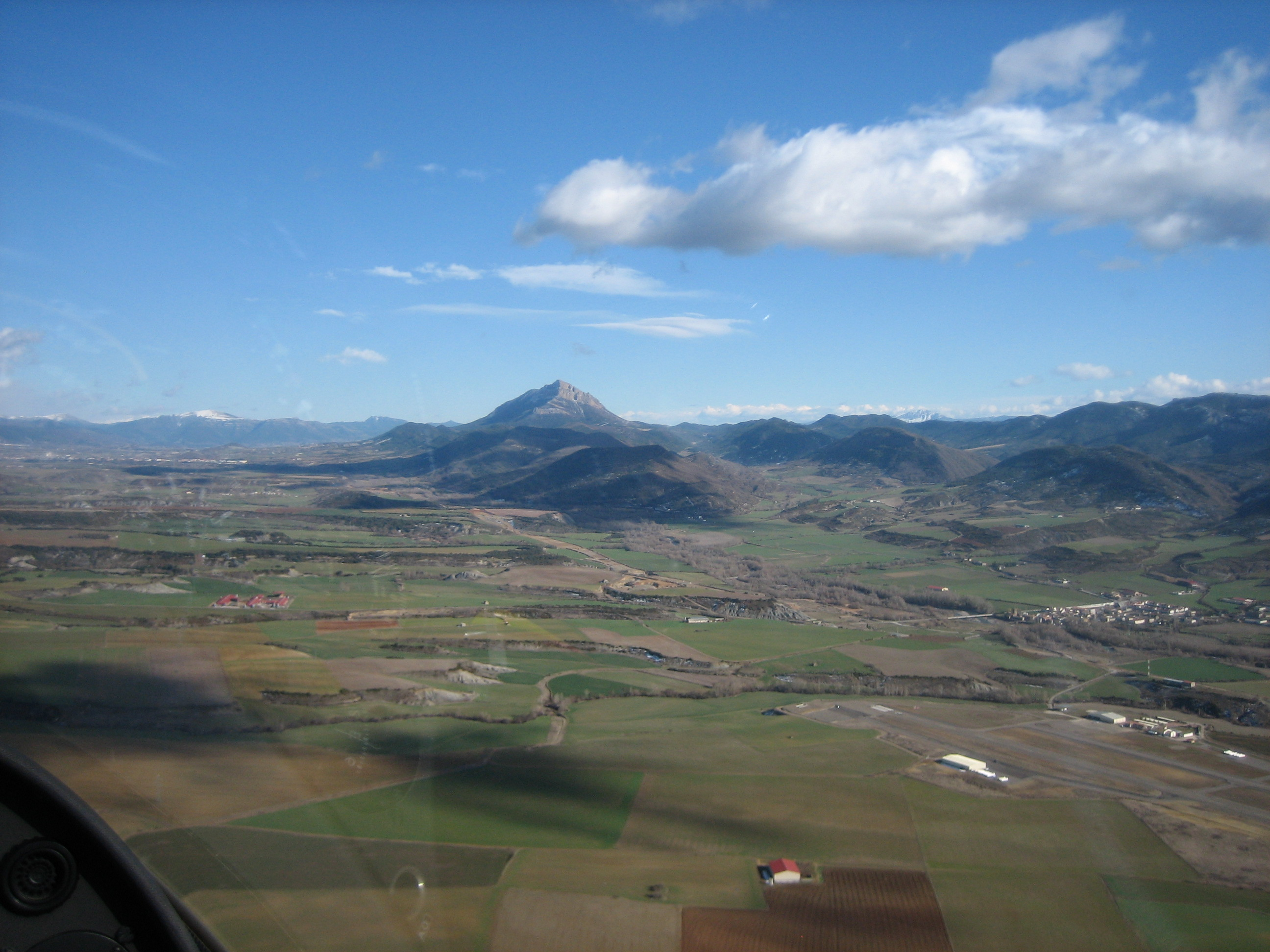
Santa Cilia airfield and Rio Aragon valley

Its airfield is a popular with glider pilots who wish to explore the nearby Pyrenees.

== Villages ==
- Santa Cilia
- Somanés is a hamlet with 14 inhabitants that has been part of the municipality since 1969. It has a baroque 18th-century parish church dedicated to San Ramon.

== Festivals ==
- 30 April (Romería a la Virgen de la Peña)
- 15 May (San Isidro)
- 8 September (La Natividad de la Virgen)
