= Villanovilla =

Settlement in Huesca Province, Aragon, Spain

Coordinates: 42°37′05″N 0°29′15″W

- Settlement
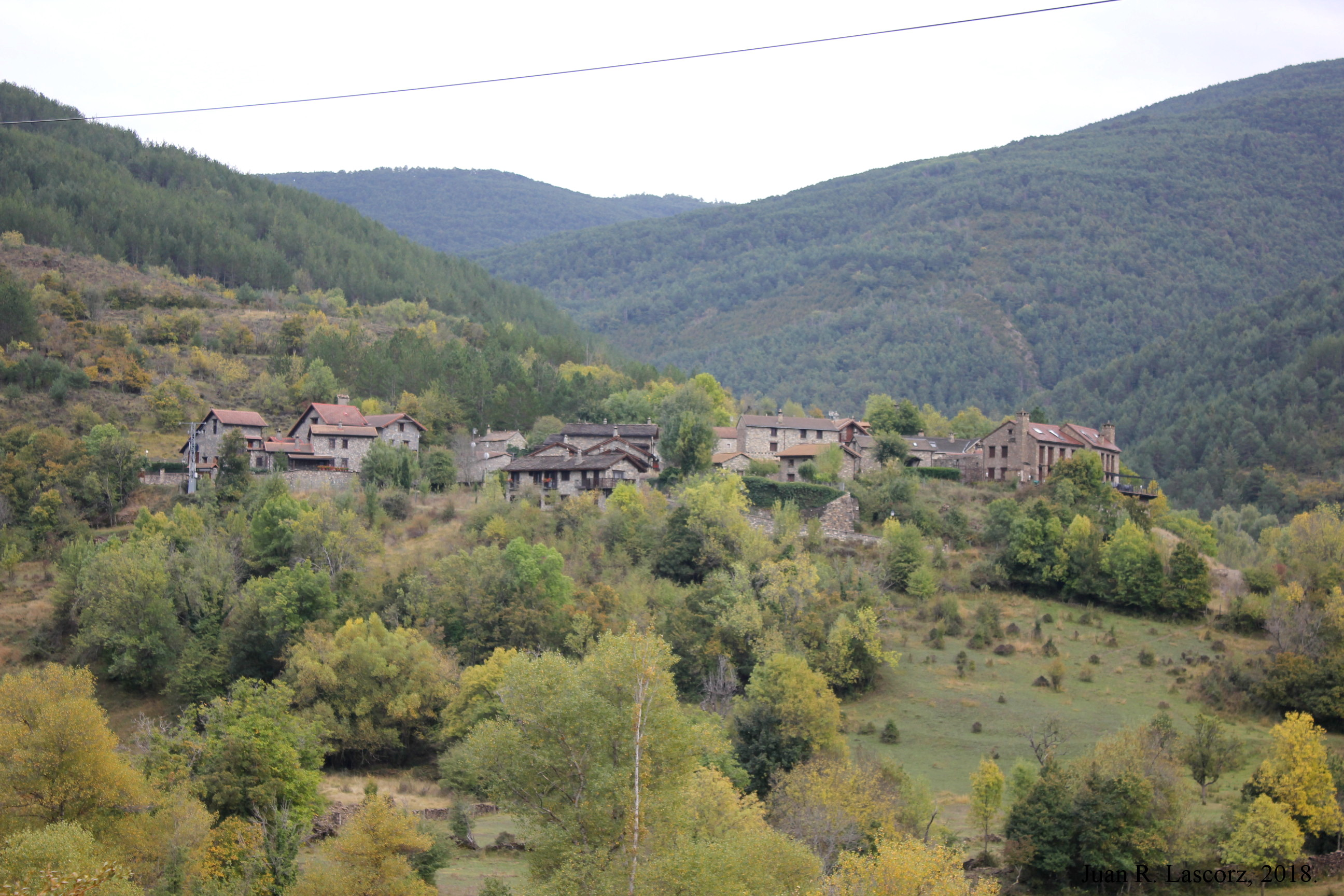

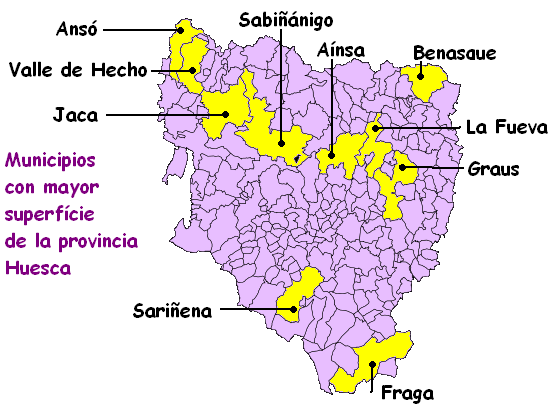
- Country: Spain
- Autonomous community: Aragon
- Province: Huesca
- Comarca: Jacetania
- Municipality: Jaca
- Elevation: 980 m (3,220 ft)

Population
  - Total: 12 (2,019)
- Postal code: 22710
- Website: http://www.jaca.com/villanovilla.htm

Villanovilla (in Aragonese Villanoviella) is a Spanish settlement belonging to the municipality of Jaca, in the Jacetania, province of Huesca, Aragon.

== Geography ==
Villanovilla is located in the lower part of the valley of the Ijuez river, a tributary of the Aragon river, in the Garcipollera.

== History ==
Unlike other towns in the valley, its urban center was reserved in property by its residents, when the State Forestry Patrimony acquired the land in the valley for reforestation. After years of depopulation, Villanovilla managed to save itself from abandonment, thanks to the rehabilitation of its houses.

== Demographics ==
=== Settlement ===
Demographic data of Villanovilla since 1900:

Historical populations of Villanovilla
Year	1900	1910	1920	1930	1940	1950	1960	1970	1981	1991	2001	2011	2019
Pop.	75	72	73	60	52	48	30	10	6	3	8	11	12
±%	—	−4.0%	+1.4%	−17.8%	−13.3%	−7.7%	−37.5%	−66.7%	−40.0%	−50.0%	+166.7%	+37.5%	+9.1%

=== Former municipality ===
Demographic data of the municipality of Villanovilla since 1842:

Historical populations of the former municipality
Year	1842	1857	1860	1877	1887	1897	1900	1910	1920
Pop.	56	346	323	–	–	–	–	–	–
±%	—	+517.9%	−6.6%	—	—	—	—	—	—

- Between the 1857 Census and the previous one, the municipality grew because it incorporated Acín and Larrosa.
- Between the 1877 Census and the previous one, this municipality disappeared because it changed its name and appeared as the municipality of Acín.
- Data refer to the de jure population, except in the 1857 and 1860 Censuses, which refer to the de facto population.

== See also ==
- Larrosa
- Acín
- Yosa de Garcipollera
- La Garcipollera
