= Larrosa =

Abandoned village in Jaca, Huesca Province, Spain

Coordinates: 42°37′58″N 0°27′10″W

- Uninhabited settlement
- Interactive map of Larrosa
- Country: Spain
- Autonomous community: Aragón
- Province: Huesca
- Comarca: Jacetania
- Municipality: Jaca
- Elevation: 1,140 m (3,740 ft)

Population
  - Total: 0

Larrosa is an unpopulated settlement and a former municipality of Spain, belonging to the present municipality of Jaca, in the comarca of Jacetania, province of Huesca, Aragon.

== Geography ==
Larrosa is located at the head of the valley of the Ijuez river, a tributary of the Aragon river, in the valley of the Garcipollera, like Acín, Villanovilla, Bescós de Garcipollera and Yosa de Garcipollera.

== History ==
The houses and fields of the municipality of Larrosa were expropriated in the 1960s, due to the construction of the Yesa Reservoir, in order to use their forests for planting pine trees to prevent the rapid silting of the new reservoir by the sediments carried by the rains.

The church dedicated to San Bartolomé has well preserved its Romanesque structure.

== Demography ==
=== Locality ===
Demographic data of the town of Larrosa since 1900:

Historical populations of Larrosa
Year	1900	1910	1920	1930	1940	1950	1960	1970	1981	1991	2001
Pop.	137	126	100	77	77	57	9	–	–	–	–
±%	—	−8.0%	−20.6%	−23.0%	+0.0%	−26.0%	−84.2%	—	—	—	—
Source: Instituto Aragonés de Estadística

- It has not been included in the Nomenclature since 1970.
- Data refer to the de jure population.

=== Former municipality ===
Demographic data of the municipality of Larrosa since 1842:

Historic populations of the former municipality
Year	1842	1857	1860	1877	1897	1900	1910
Pop.	74	–	–	–	–	–	–
±%	—	—	—	—	—	—	—

- Between the 1857 Census and the previous one, this municipality disappears because it is integrated into the municipality of Villanovilla.
- Data refer to the de jure population, except in the 1857 and 1860 Censuses, which refer to the de facto population.

== See also ==
- Villanovilla
- Bescós de Garcipollera
- Bergosa
- Acín
- Yosa de Garcipollera
