= Bagüés =

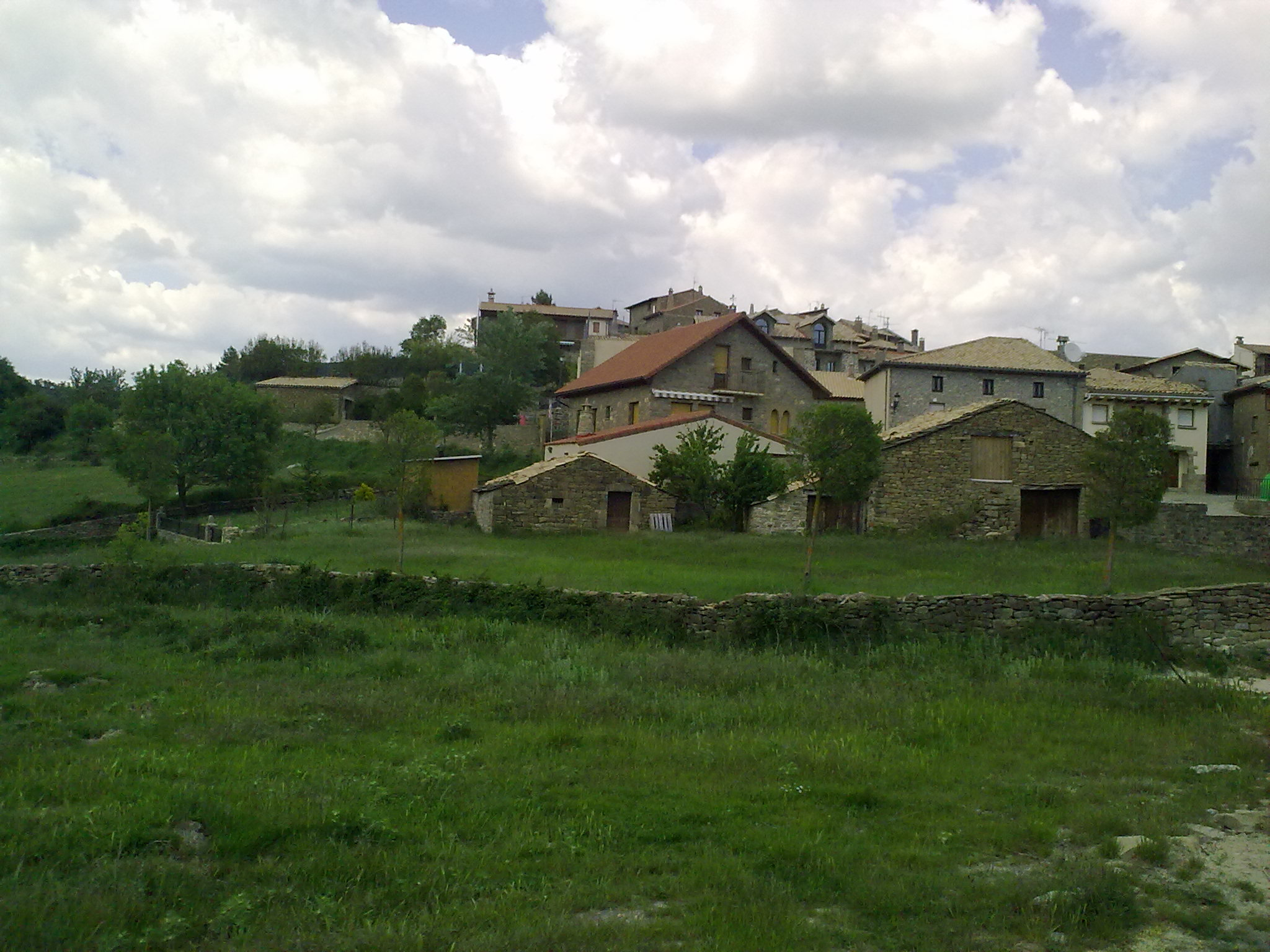

- Flag Coat of arms

- Location within Aragon Location within Spain Location within Europe
- Country: Spain
- Autonomous community: Aragon
- Province: Zaragoza
- Comarca: Cinco Villas, Aragon

Area
  - Total: 30 km^{2} (12 sq mi)

Population (2025-01-01)
  - Total: 16
  - Density: 0.53/km^{2} (1.4/sq mi)
- Time zone: UTC+1 (CET)
  - Summer (DST): UTC+2 (CEST)

Bagüés is a municipality located in the province of Zaragoza, Aragon, Spain. According to the 2004 census (INE), the municipality has a population of 43 inhabitants.

One of its most notable inhabitants was the young militant Desideria Giménez Moner, a victim of Francoist repression. The town has a street named after her.

== See also ==
- List of municipalities in Zaragoza
