= Bergosa =

Uninhabited settlement in the province of Huesca, Aragon, Spain

Coordinates: 42°36′54″N 0°32′12″W

- Abandoned settlement
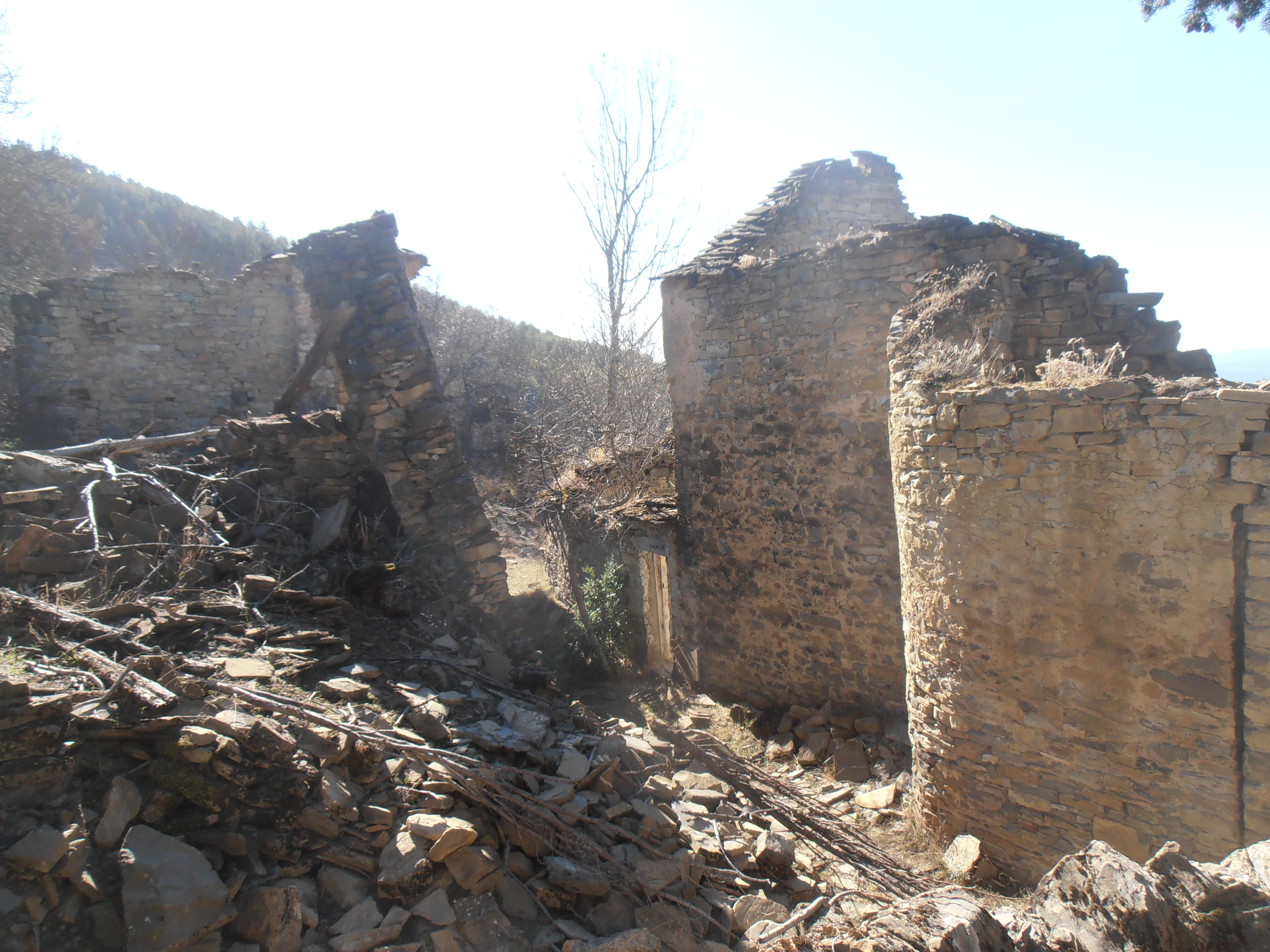

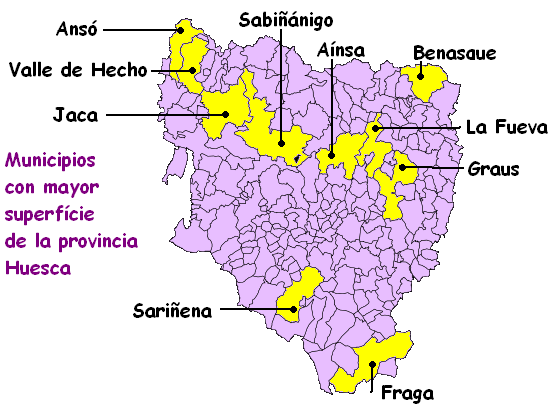
- Country: Spain
- Autonomous community: Aragon
- Province: Huesca
- Comarca: Jacetania
- Municipality: Jaca
- Elevation: 1,128 m (3,701 ft)

Population
  - Total: 0 (INE 2,019)

Bergosa is an unpopulated settlement belonging to the municipality of Jaca, in the region of Jacetania, province of Huesca, Aragon. It is part of the Garcipollera.

== Toponymy ==
According to Agustín Ubieto, the first mention of the place dates from 948 or 962, in the work of his brother, Antonio Ubieto, Cartulario de San Juan de la Peña II, in Textos Medievales, 6 (Valencia, 1963) and documents the variations Bergossa, Bergosi, Bergasa, Uergosa, Uergossa and Bergosa.

== Geography ==
In 1966, the place was expropriated, as in the rest of the Garcipollera, in order to carry out an important reforestation of conifers on its slopes as a measure to retain the erosion caused by the construction of the Yesa Reservoir.

== Demographics ==
=== Locality ===
Demographic data on the town of Bergosa since 1900:

Historical populations of Bergosa
Year	1900	1910	1920	1930	1940	1950	1960	1970
Pop.	60	51	59	59	51	36	31	–
±%	—	−15.0%	+15.7%	+0.0%	−13.6%	−29.4%	−13.9%	—

- It has not been included in the Nomenclator since 1970.
- Data refer to de jure population.

=== Former municipality ===
Demographic data of the municipality of Bergosa since 1842:

Historical populations of the former municipality
Year	1842	1857	1860	1877	1887	1897	1900	1910
Pop.	87	–	–	–	–	–	–	–
±%	—	—	—	—	—	—	—	—

- In the 1842 census it was called Bergosa y Mesón del Señor.
- Between the 1857 and the previous census, this municipality disappeared because it was integrated into the municipality of Bescós de Garcipollera.
- Data refer to the population by right, except in the 1857 and 1860 Censuses, which refer to the de facto population.

== Local holidays ==
- November 29, San Saturnino.

== See also ==
- Larrosa
- Acín
- La Garcipollera

== Gallery ==
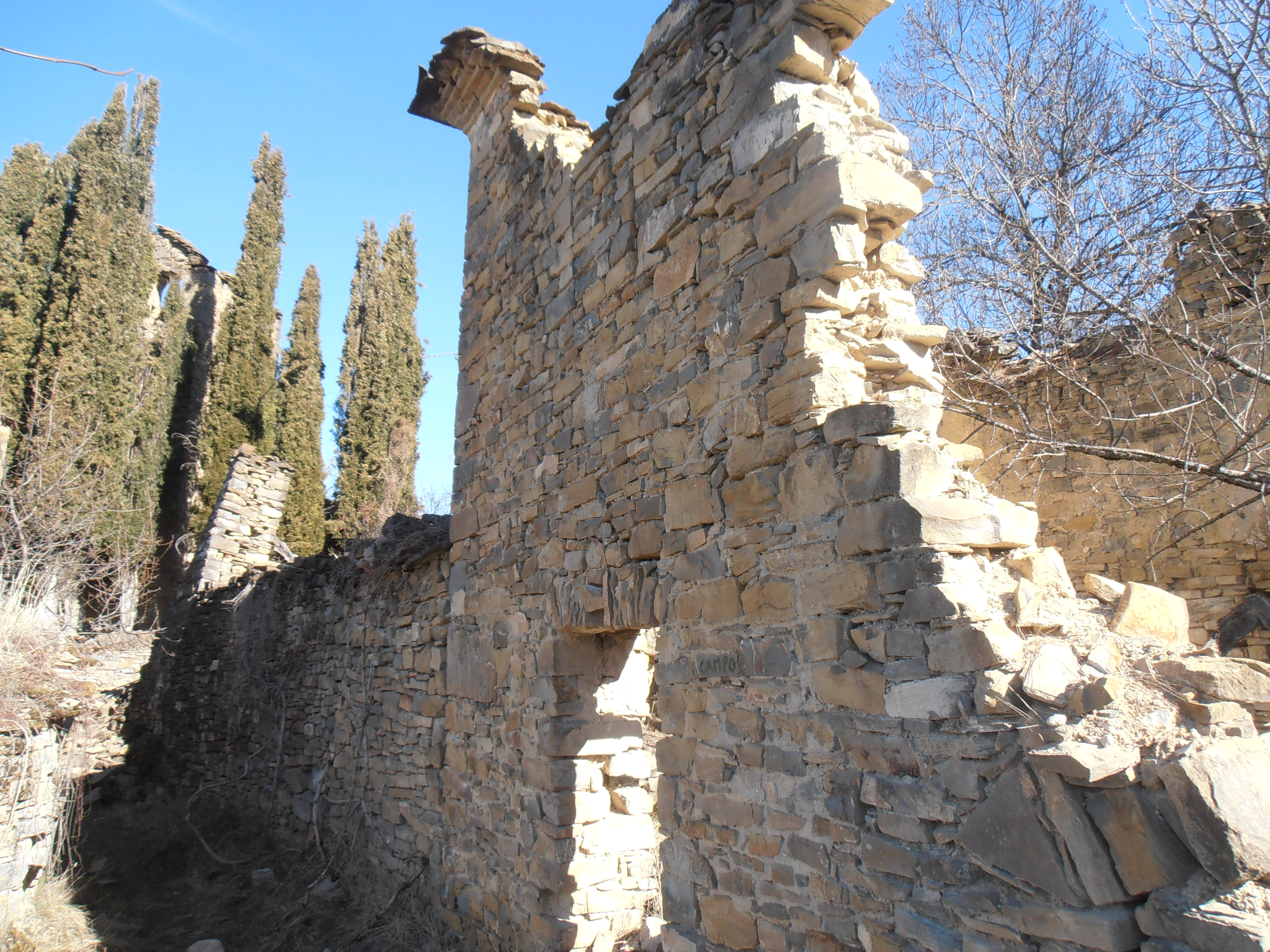

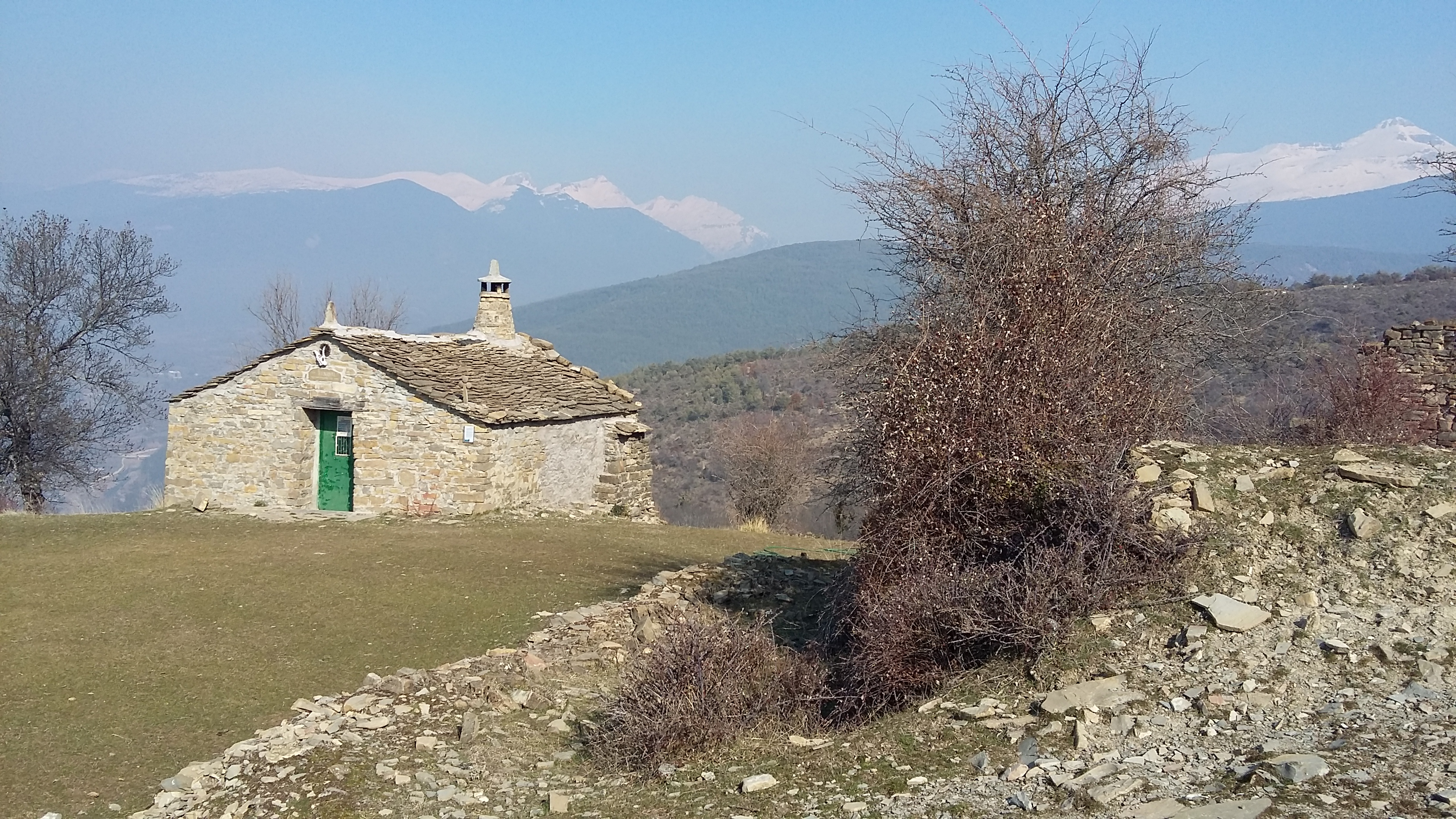

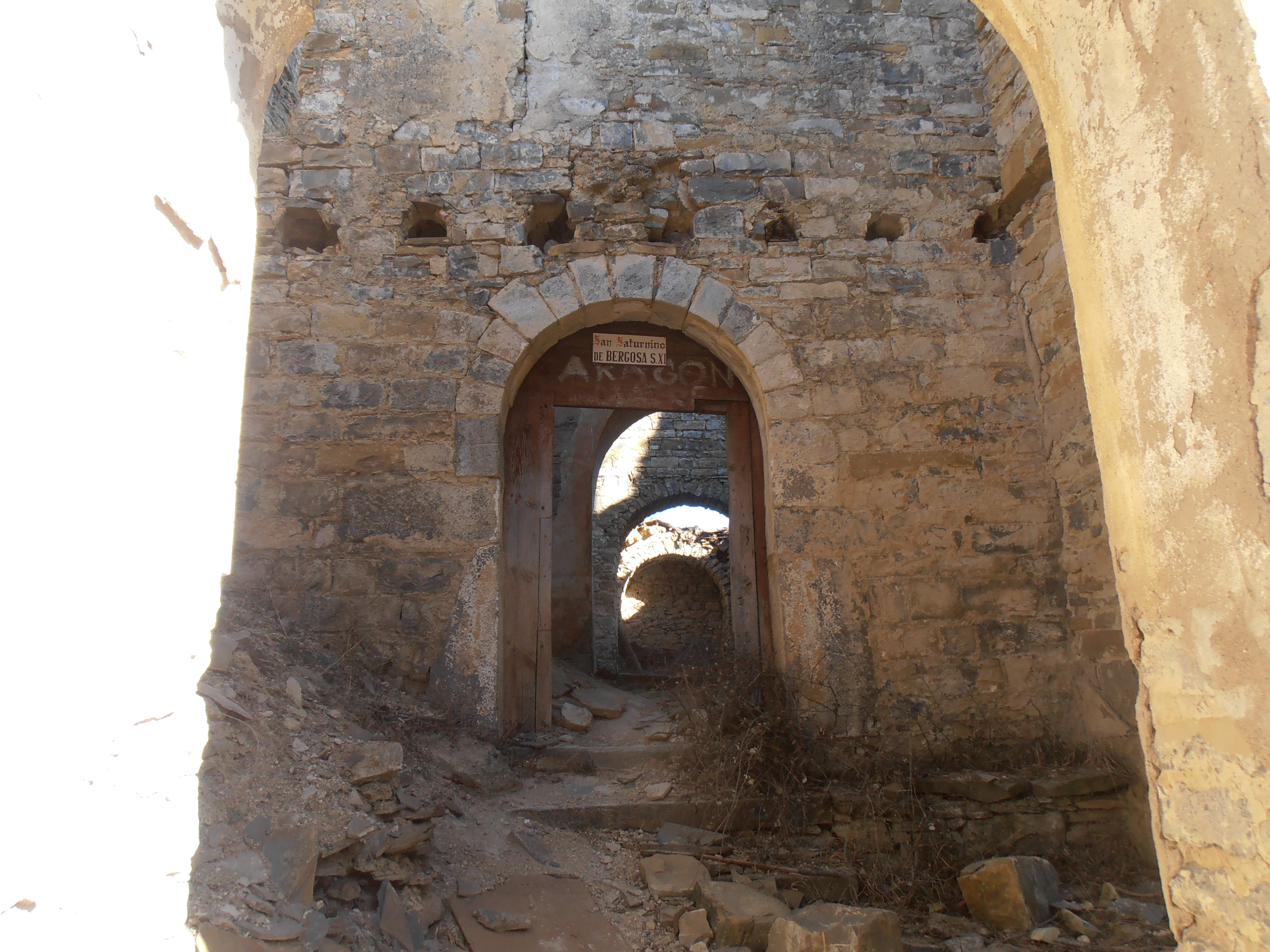

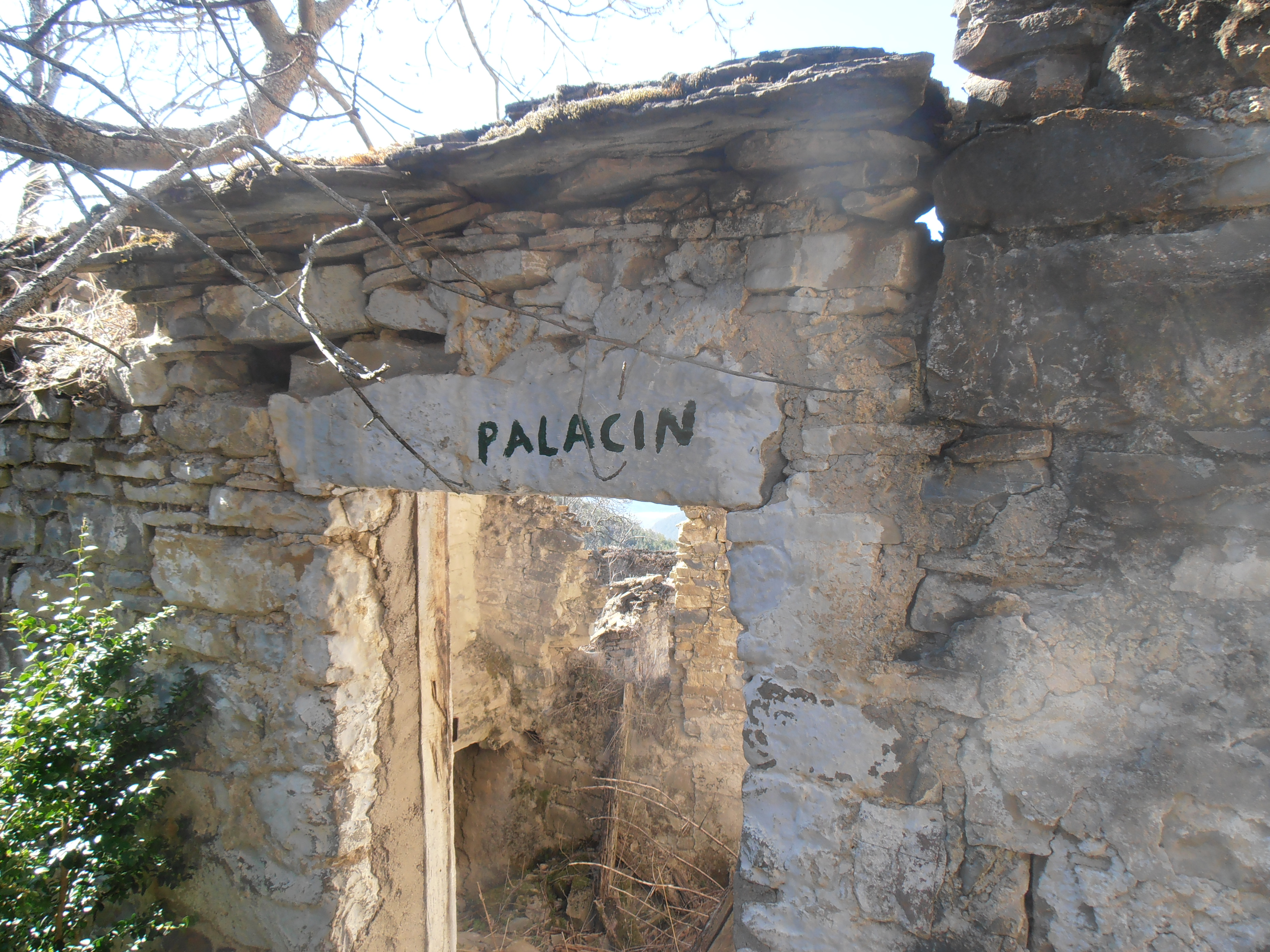

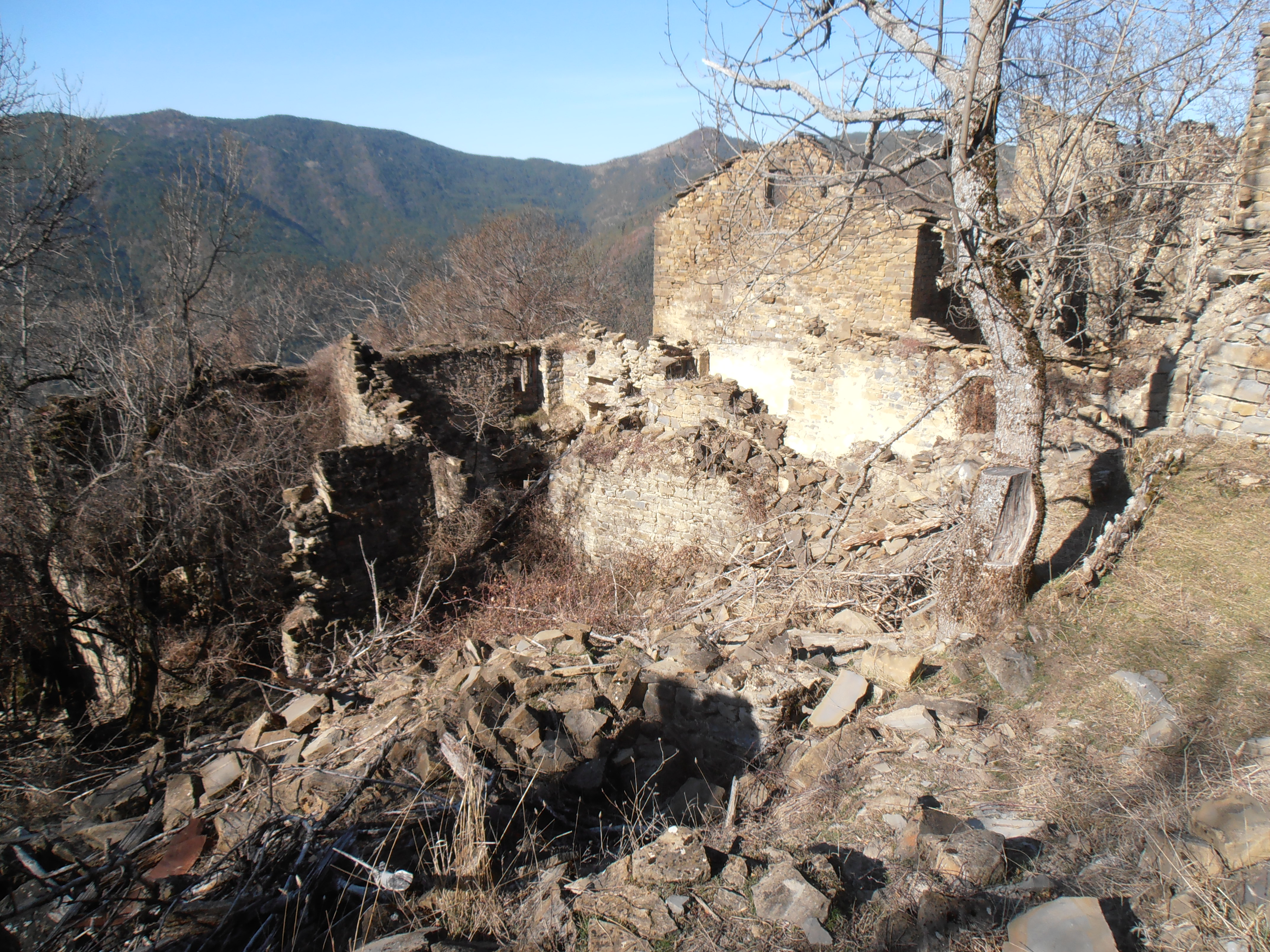

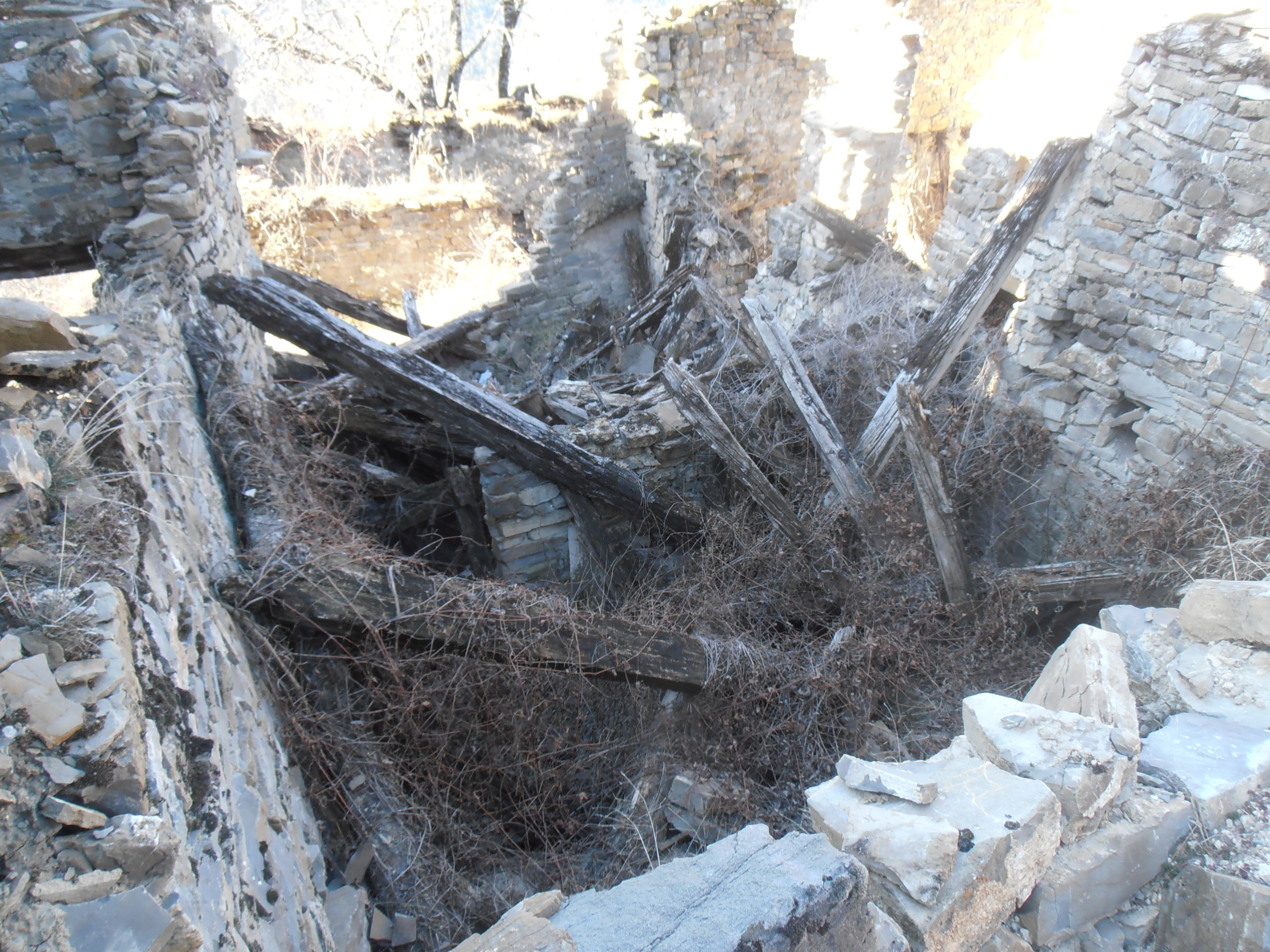

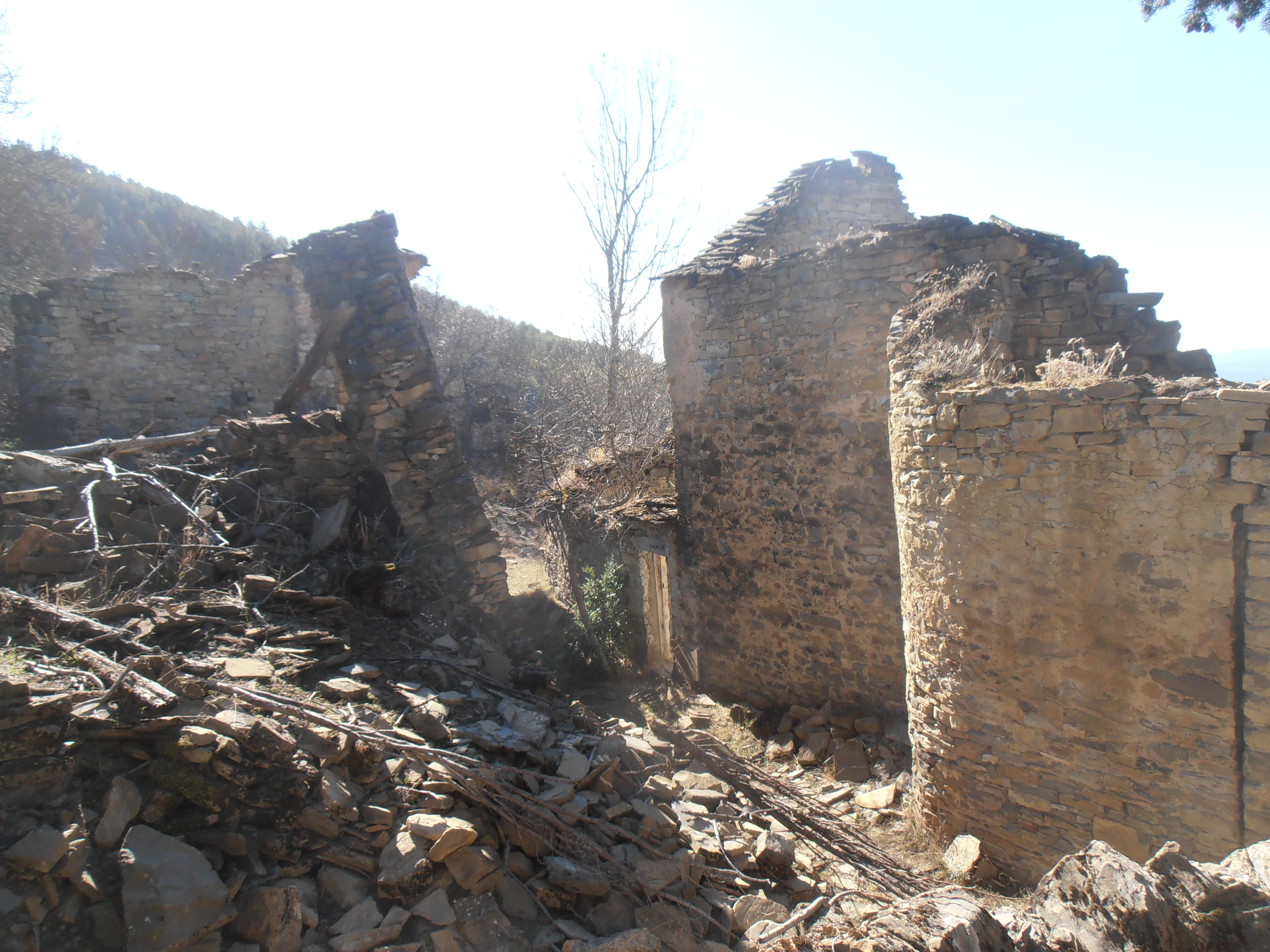
