= Aratorés =

Coordinates: 42°39′N 0°34′W

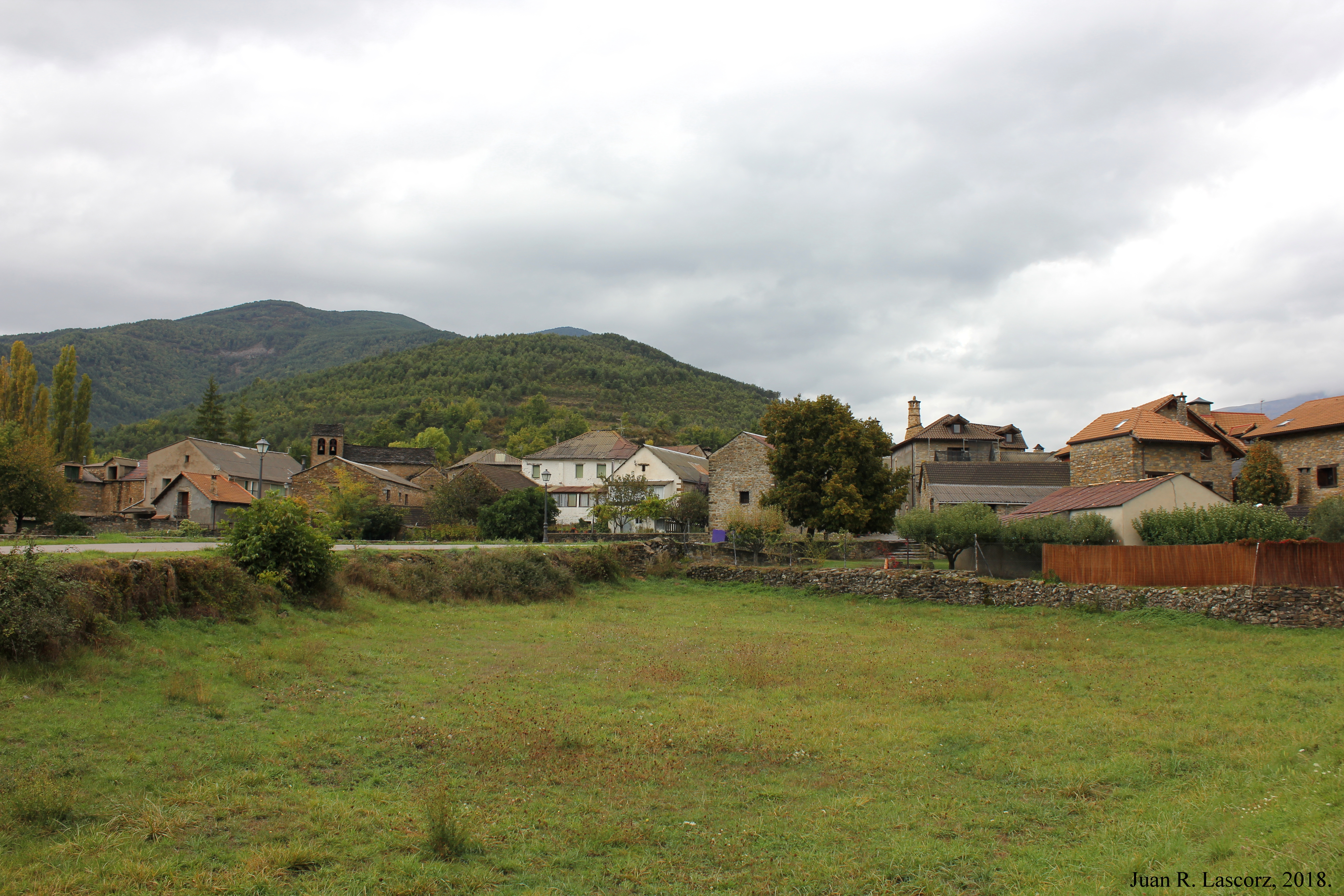
- Interactive map of Aratorés
- Country: Spain
- Autonomous community: Aragon
- Province: Huesca
- Elevation: 1,021 m (3,350 ft)

Population (2012)
  - Total: 40
- Time zone: UTC+1 (CET)
  - Summer (DST): UTC+2 (CEST)

Aratorés is a small village located in the municipality of Castiello de Jaca in the Huesca province of Aragón, Spain. According to the 2012 census (INE), the village has a population of 40 inhabitants. Aratorés is located at an altitude of 1,021 metres (3,350 ft) and it is at the top of a hill that dominates the Aragón valley.
