= Desideria Giménez Moner =

Spanish republican activist

Desideria Giménez Moner (Bagüés, 4 August 1919-Jaca, 7 August 1936), known under the alias La Cazoleta, was a Spanish republican activist murdered in the early months of the Spanish Civil War. She became a symbol of Jaca after leading a May Day march. The towns of Bagüés, Jaca and Zaragoza have streets named in her honour.

== Biography ==
Desideria was born in the small town of Bagüés, in the Cinco Villas region of Zaragoza. Her father, Juan José Giménez Artieda, was a construction worker and her mother, Isabel Moner was from Catalonia. When she was young the family moved to Jaca where her parents ran a bar called La Cazoleta, the name under which she was later known.

She was active in the Juventudes Socialistas Unificadas (JSU) and worked with Socorro Rojo Internacional. In 1936, aged 16 she led the May Day march, waving the red flag and followed by more than 3000 people.

=== Repression and murder ===
With the triumph of the coup of against the Second Republic in 1936, Giménez Moner was imprisoned for her antifascist activities. On 6 August 1936, she was taken from the prison together with Pilar Vizcarra Calvo, a pregnant woman who had been made to witness the execution of her husband by Hermenegildo de Fustiñana and other Carlists. She was raped and murdered by firing squad on the 7th of August, three days after her 17th birthday. Vizcarra Calvo was murdered alongside her. Later in 1936 her father was also executed and they were buried in a mass grave .

The bodies of Desideria Giménez, her father and another 312 people were found in a mass grave (number 16) in the cemetery of Jaca.

== Homages ==
- In August 1998 the town council of Bagüés named a street for her and one for Gerardo Ponz Pérez, born in the locality.
- In 2010 a sculpture was unveiled in the new part of the cemetery of Jaca. The work of local artist Pablo Valdevira, it pays homage to the memory of the 417 jacetanos executed between 1936 and 1942. The town also has a street named La Cazoleta.
- On 20 May 2016, the Neighbourhood Association San José of Zaragoza petitioned the President of the Distrito de Barcelona to change the name of the street Diez de Agosto (commemorating the first coup attempt against the Second Republic in 1931) to Desideria Giménez Moner. On May Day 2018 there was an homage and commemoration of the new street name Desideria Giménez Moner (La cazoleta).
- In Jaca, there is a monolith in homage to La Cazoleta.
- The life and death of Desideria inspired the poet Gregório Olivan García to write Romance de la Cazoleta, studied by French philologists and included in books on the Civil War. The Asociación Desideria Giménez, a feminist organisation committed to social transformation is named in tribute to her.

== Bibliography ==
- Buesa Conde, Domingo (2024). Desideria (in Spanish). Doce Robles. ISBN 9788460583974.

== See also ==
- White Terror (Spain)
  - Victims of the White Terror (Spain)
- Las trece rosas, a group of executed Republican women
