= Somanés =

- Locality
- Location within Aragon Location within Spain
- Coordinates: 42°35′29″N 0°41′48″W
- Country: Spain
- Autonomous community: Aragon
- Province: Province of Huesca
- Municipality: Santa Cilia
- Elevation: 831 m (2,726 ft)

Population
  - Total: 15

Somanés is a hamlet located in the municipality of Santa Cilia, in Huesca province, Aragon, Spain. As of 2020, it has a population of 15.

== Geography ==
Somanés is located 85km north-northwest of Huesca.
