= Castiello de Jaca =

Coordinates: 42°38′N 0°33′W

Castiello de Jaca (Spanish) Castiello de Chaca (Aragonese)
- municipality
- Flag Coat of arms
- Interactive map of Castiello de Jaca (Spanish)
- Country: Spain
- Autonomous community: Aragon
- Province: Huesca

Area
  - Total: 17 km^{2} (6.6 sq mi)

Population (2025-01-01)
  - Total: 280
  - Density: 16/km^{2} (43/sq mi)
- Time zone: UTC+1 (CET)
  - Summer (DST): UTC+2 (CEST)

Castiello de Jaca (in Aragonese: Castiello de Chaca) is a municipality located in the province of Huesca, Aragon, Spain. According to the 2004 census (INE), the municipality has a population of 198 inhabitants. It is serviced by the Jaca-Astun bus. There are 2 restaurants/bars. Recent developments have seen the size of the town increase greatly.

== Villages ==
- Aratorés
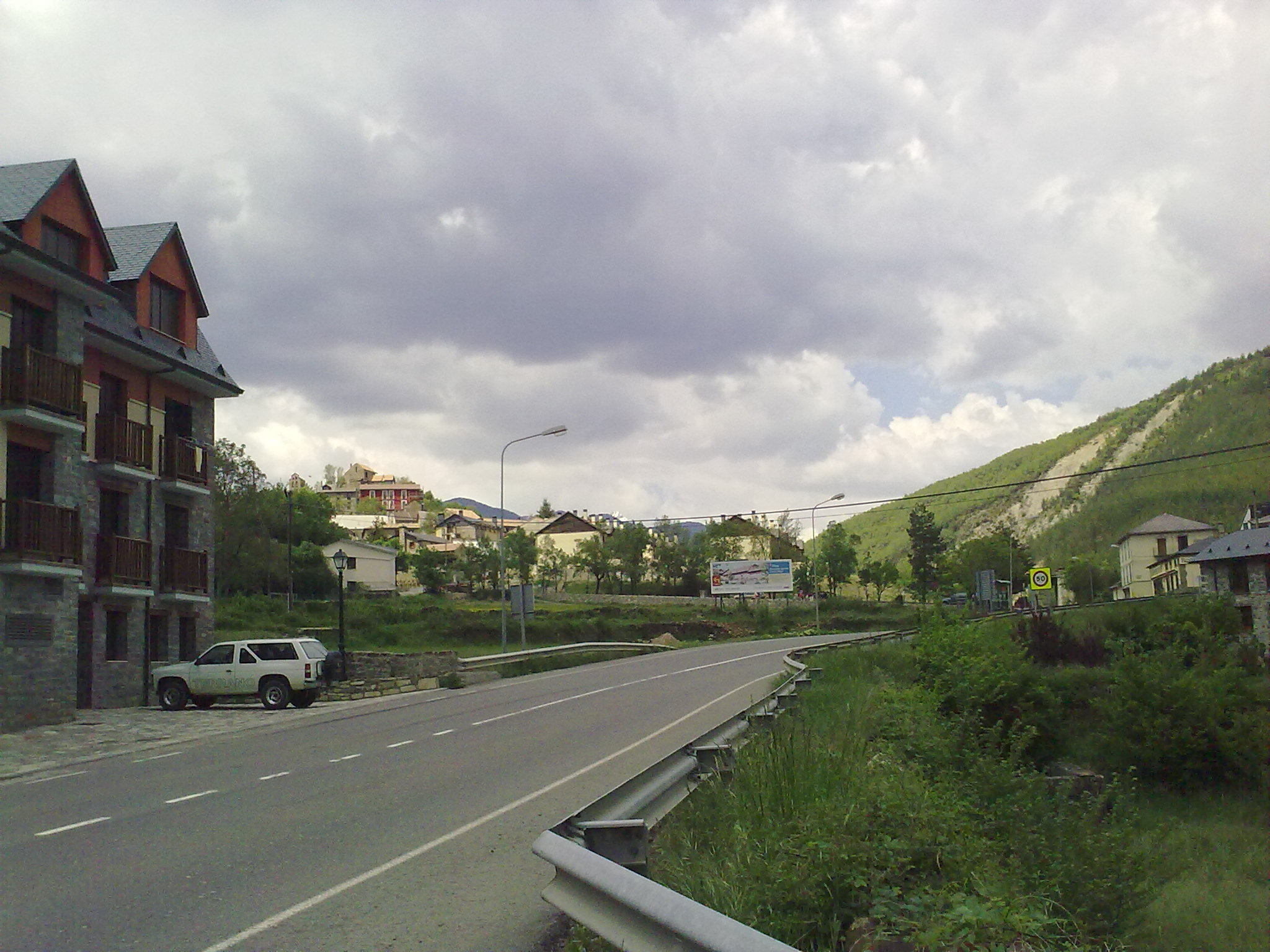
Castiello de Jaca, The Main Street

== See also ==
- List of municipalities in Huesca

Preceded by Villanúa	The Aragonese Way of the Way of St. James	Succeeded by Jaca
