= Acín =

Abandoned village in Huesca Province, Aragon, Spain

Coordinates: 42°37′34″N 0°27′55″W

- Abandoned village
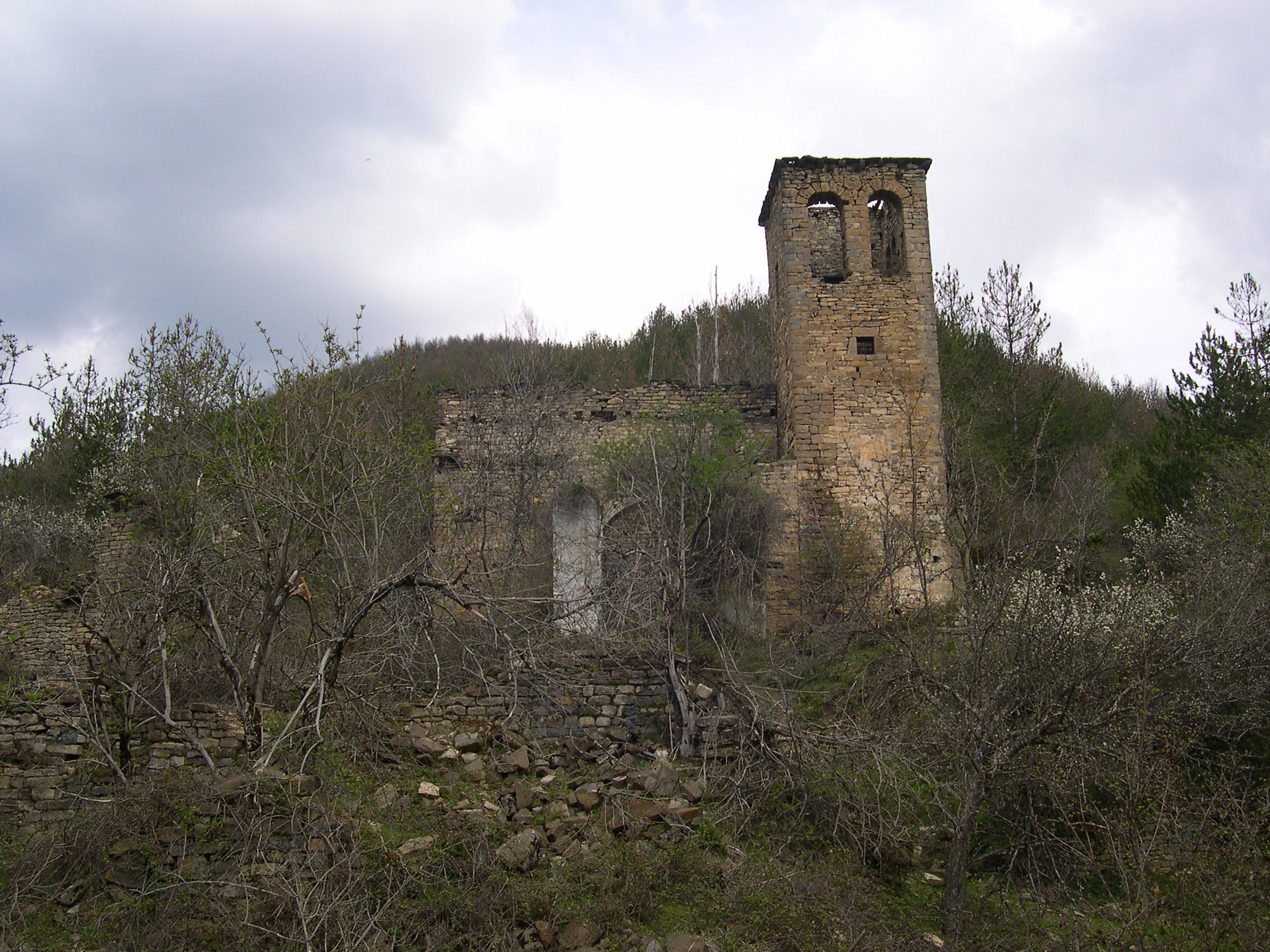
- Nickname: carboneros
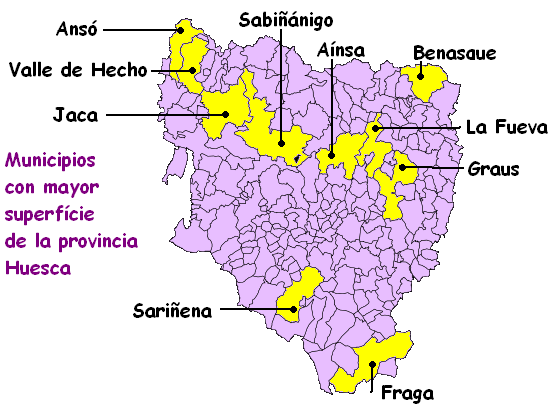
- Country: Spain
- Autonomous community: Aragón
- Province: Huesca
- Comarca: Jacetania
- Municipality: Jaca

Population
  - Total: 0 (2,019)

Acín is an unpopulated village in Spain, within the municipality of Jaca, in the province of Huesca. It is located in the valley of the Garcipollera, in the Aragonese region of the Jacetania.

It is not inhabited, after having been expropriated in the 1960s for the construction of the Yesa Reservoir, with the intention of replanting it with pine trees to prevent the accumulation of sediments caused by the rains from accelerating the clogging of the newly built reservoir.

== Geography ==
The remains of Acín, today in complete ruins and invaded by vegetation, are located in the valley of the Ijuez river, a tributary of the Aragón river, in the Garcipollera, at a short distance from the riverbed of the aforementioned river. The name Garcipollera originates from having been known as vallis Cepollaria in Roman times, which in Spanish translates as onion valley.

The only remaining buildings are the ruins of the Romanesque church of San Juan Bautista. On the river bank, there is a communal recreational area.

== History ==
In 1374 it is mentioned as Açin de la Rosa.

In 1961, and according to the terms of Decree 2543/61, of December 7, published in the Official State Gazette number 303, of December 20, Acín was officially incorporated into the municipality of Jaca.

The temple of San Juan Bautista, the only remaining building and currently in ruins, was owned by the Monastery of San Juan de la Peña until the 16th century when it passed to the Diocese of Jaca. It was the parish church of the town. Of simple construction, it consists of a rectangular nave topped by a semicircular apse in the area of the altar. In the 17th century the church was renovated and a new nave was attached to the south wall of the existing one. Within its constructive simplicity, two elements stand out: the square tower that served as a bell tower and that today marks the location of Acin among the undergrowth and the original apse, built in the 13th century.

== Demographics ==
=== Locality ===
Demographic data for the town of Acín since 1900:

Historical populations of Acín
Year	1900	1910	1920	1930	1940	1950	1960	1970
Pop.	140	133	131	138	120	95	30	–
±%	—	−5.0%	−1.5%	+5.3%	−13.0%	−20.8%	−68.4%	—
Source: IAEST

- It has not been included in the Nomenclature since 1970.
- Data refer to the de jure population.

=== Former municipality ===
Demographic data of the municipality of Acín, 1842

Historical populations of the former municipality
Year	1842	1857	1860	1877	1887	1897	1900	1910	1920	1930	1940	1950	1960	1970
Pop.	74	–	–	319	312	349	352	331	304	275	249	200	69	–
±%	—	—	—	—	−2.2%	+11.9%	+0.9%	−6.0%	−8.2%	−9.5%	−9.5%	−19.7%	−65.5%	—
Source: INE

- Between the 1857 Census and the previous one, this municipality disappeared because it was integrated into the municipality of Villanovilla.
- Between the 1877 Census and the previous one, this municipality appears because it changes its name and the municipality of Villanovilla disappears.
- Between the 1970 Census and the previous one, this municipality disappeared because it became part of the municipality of Jaca.
- Data refer to the de jure population, except in the 1857 and 1860 Censuses, which refer to the de facto population.

== See also ==
- Larrosa
- Bescós de Garcipollera
- La Garcipollera
- Villanovilla
