= Jaca =

Jaca Chaca (Aragonese) Xaca (Aragonese)
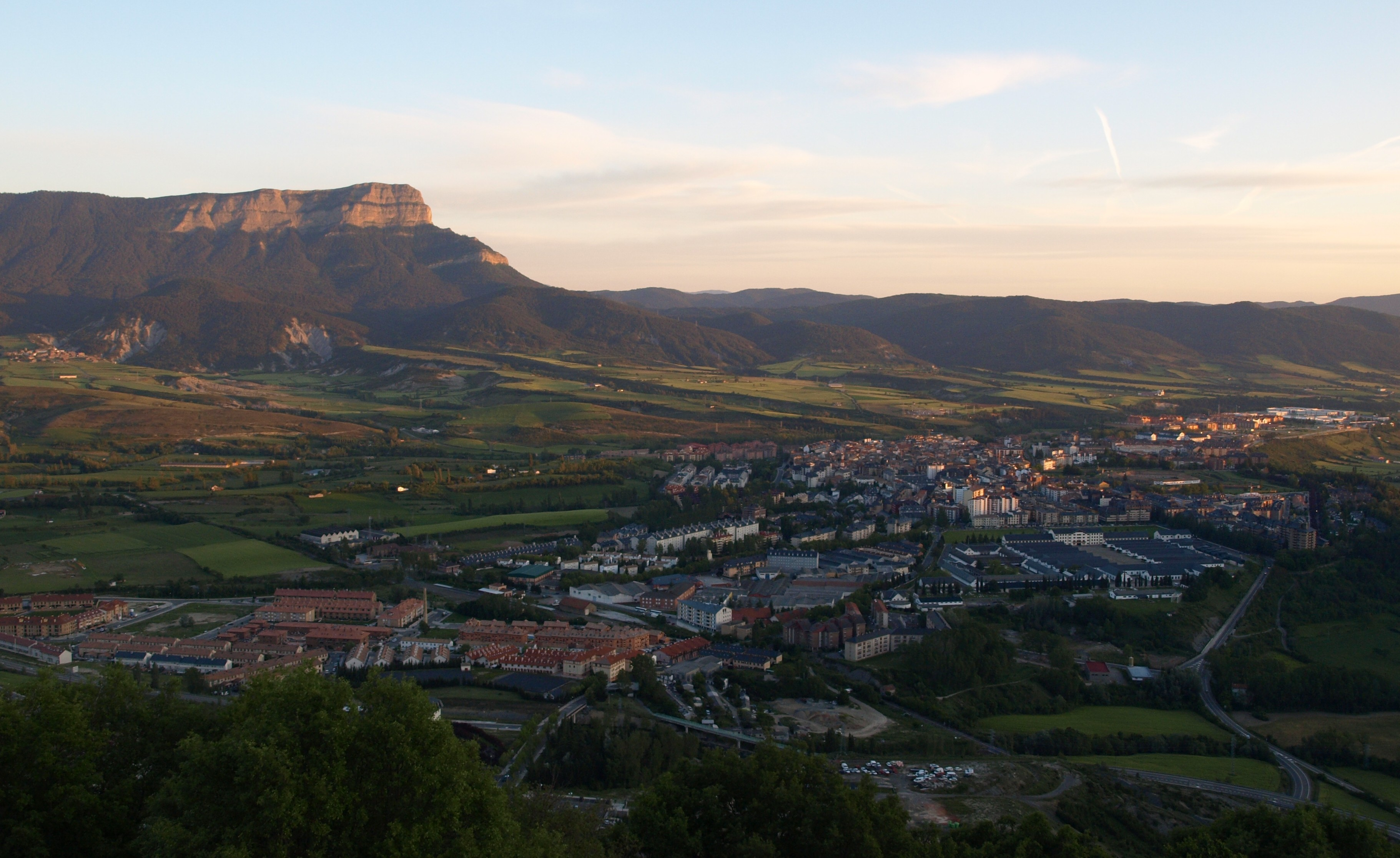
- Jaca as viewed from the Rapitan fort.

- Flag Coat of arms
- Interactive map of Jaca
- Location within Aragon Location within Spain
- Coordinates: 42°33′N 0°33′W
- Country: Spain
- Autonomous community: Aragon
- Province: Huesca
- Comarca: La Jacetania

Government
  - Mayor: Juan Manuel Ramón Ipas

Area
  - Total: 406.34 km^{2} (156.89 sq mi)
- Elevation: 820 m (2,690 ft)

Population (2025-01-01)
  - Total: 14,024
  - Density: 34.513/km^{2} (89.388/sq mi)
- Time zone: UTC+1 (CET)
  - Summer (DST): UTC+2 (CET)
- Website: www.jaca.es

Jaca (Spanish pronunciation: ['xaka]; in Aragonese: Chaca or Xaca) is a city of northeastern Spain in the province of Huesca, located near the Pyrenees and the border with France. Jaca is an ancient fort on the Aragón River, situated at the crossing of two great early medieval routes, one from Toulouse to Santiago de Compostela and Pau to Zaragoza. Jaca was the city out of which the County and Kingdom of Aragon developed. It was the first capital of the Kingdom of Aragon until 1096 and also the capital of Jacetania.

== Villages ==
Besides Jaca town, there are a number of outlying villages in the municipality of Jaca, including the ski resort of Astún.

== History ==
The origins of the city are obscure, but its name is apparently of Iacetani origin, as Strabo lists them as one of the most celebrated of the numerous small tribes inhabiting the Ebro basin. Strabo adds that their territory lay on the site of the wars in the 1st century BC between Sertorius and Pompey. According to the atlas of the ancient Greek and Roman worlds, Jaca was a town where minted coins were made from the second half of the 2nd century BC, a small number of which are now in the British Museum. The coins show an unidentified bearded head to the right with an inscription to the left and also have an image of a dolphin. The reverse depicts a horseman carrying a spear to the right, with an inscription below in Iberian reading iaka. In the year 195 BC, the Roman consul Cato the Elder began the conquest of the city, ending in the spring of 194 BC.

After Roman rule, the Visigothic nobility took over most of Iberia. However, in 720, Huesca is conquered by the Muslims reaching out as far as Sobrarbe. Muslim advances in Europe had a turn of events after the Battle of Tours (732). By that time, the region of Jacetania would remain as a buffer zone in favour of the Carolingian Empire against Muslim dominions. By 799 Aureolo stabilised an independent county which gradually evolved until Ramiro I of Aragon (1035–1063) granted it the title of City and capital of the Kingdom of Aragon. In 1063 it was the site of the Synod of Jaca. As the Aragonese domains expanded to the south, conquering land from Al Andalus, the capital city was moved from Jaca to Huesca in 1096. The loss of capital status did not mean that Jaca lost other urban functions related to its geographical location. Thus, it continued to play its role as a market city and services for its region.

The plagues and fires of the late Middle Ages plunged Jaca into a deep crisis from which it would not emerge until the intervention of Ferdinand the Catholic to form a local government. The bourgeoisie was favored by this situation and many became patrons of artists whose results can be seen especially in the cathedral. The city was consolidated as a military post from which to defend the peninsular kingdoms from a hypothetical French invasion. In this regard, Philip II ordered the construction of several fortresses throughout the Pyrenees, including in 1592 the pentagonal Jaca citadel, designed by the Italian engineer Tibúrcio Spannocchi in the fields that had formed the Burgo Nuevo, the neighborhood built outside the city walls.

During the Middle Ages, Jaca was home to Aragon's oldest Jewish community until the 1492 expulsion of the Jews.

On December 12–13, 1930 the Jaca uprising, a mutiny whose leaders demanded abolition of the monarchy, was suppressed with some difficulty. It was an early event that preceded the Spanish Civil War. Jaca fell to the forces of the coup against the Second Republic in the early months of the war. August 1936 saw the arrest, rape and execution of the young militant Desideria Giménez Moner, aka La Cazoleta, by Carlist soldiers. Murdered alongside her on 7th August 1936 was Pilar Vizcarra Calvo, a pregnant widow who had recently witnessed the execution of her husband. Before the end of 1936 the father of La cazoleta, Juan José Giménez Artieda was also executed and they were buried in a mass grave, along with more than 300 other victims of the White Terror, in the cemetery of Jaca.

== Climate ==
Jaca has a submediterranean climate (Köppen: Cfb) bordering a submediterranean climate (Köppen: Cfa) with strong continental influences caused by the city's high altitude of 820 metres (2,690 ft). Winters are cool and summers are warm, with hot daytime temperatures but relatively cool nights. There isn't any real dry season, but the rainiest seasons are autumn and spring. The average precipitation is 768 millimetres (30.2 in) per year. Frost is common and so is snowfall, snow being common from late November to early March. Heavy snowfalls are sporadic and usually occur during cold spells. Jaca's average annual temperature is 12.2 °C (54.0 °F).

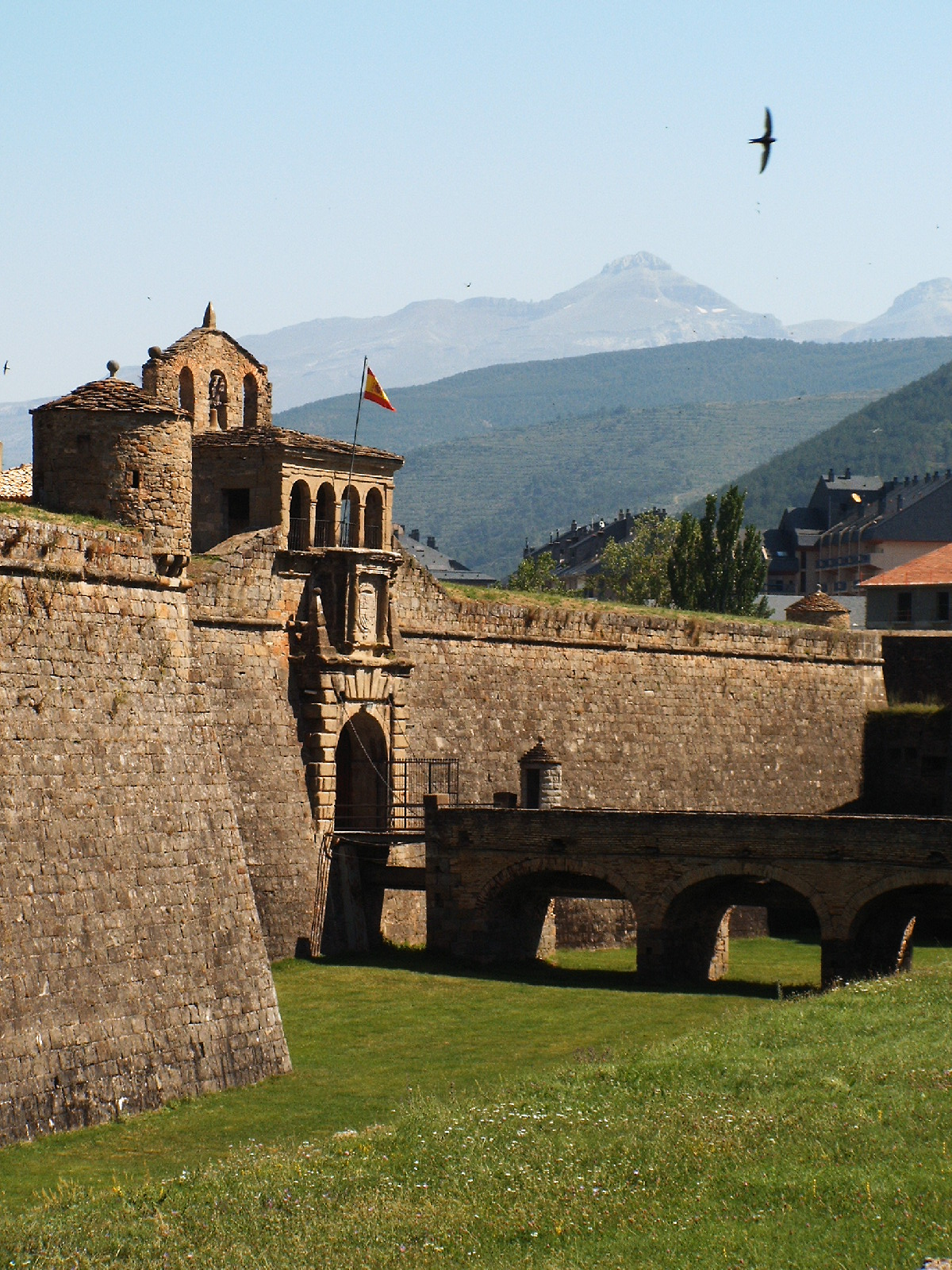
Citadel of Jaca.

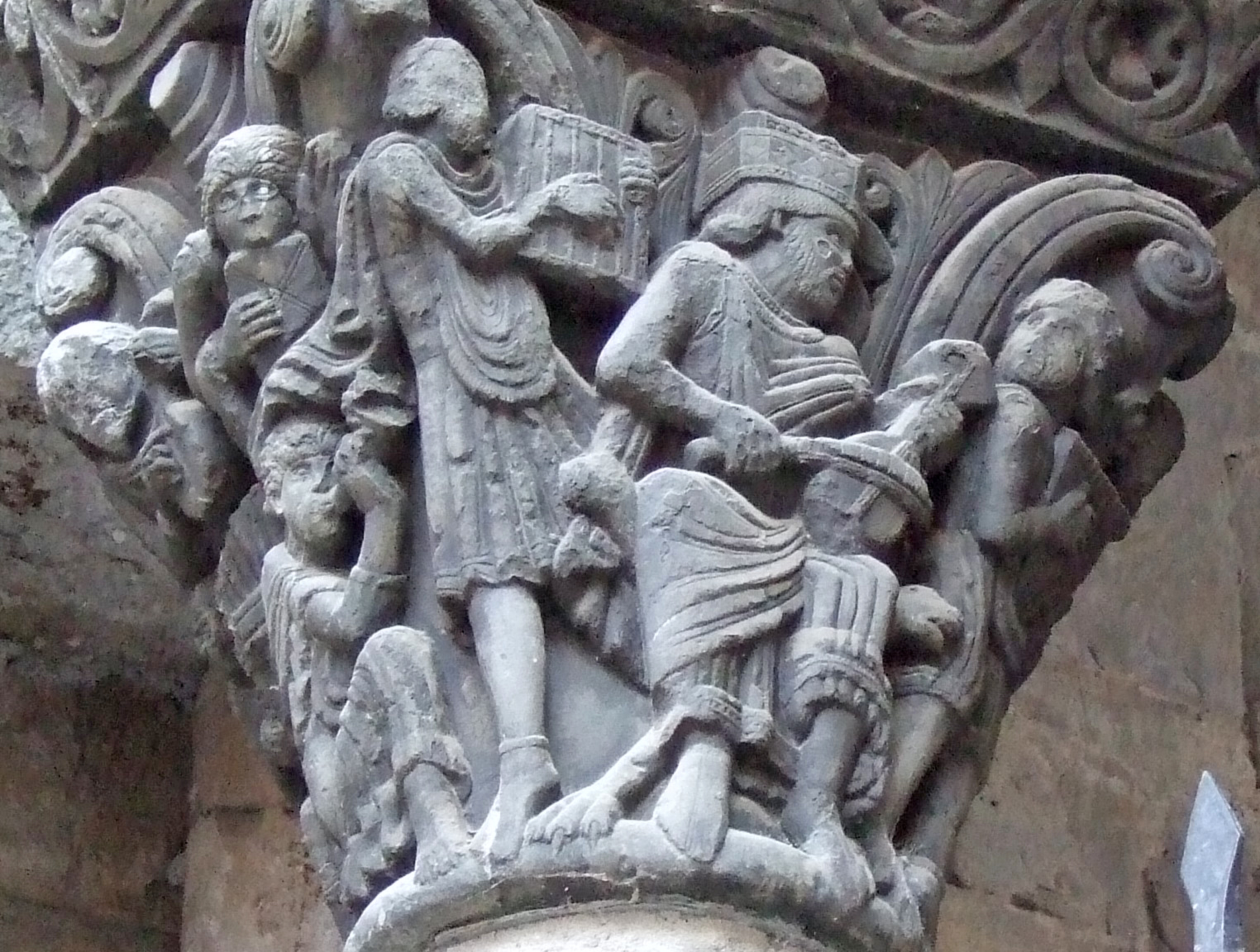
Detail of the interior of Jaca Cathedral.

Climate data for Jaca, 1981–2010
Month	Jan	Feb	Mar	Apr	May	Jun	Jul	Aug	Sep	Oct	Nov	Dec	Year
Mean daily maximum °C (°F)	9.5 (49.1)	11.0 (51.8)	14.7 (58.5)	16.2 (61.2)	20.5 (68.9)	25.7 (78.3)	29.4 (84.9)	29.0 (84.2)	24.4 (75.9)	19.0 (66.2)	13.2 (55.8)	9.8 (49.6)	18.5 (65.4)
Daily mean °C (°F)	4.4 (39.9)	5.3 (41.5)	8.3 (46.9)	10.0 (50.0)	14.0 (57.2)	18.4 (65.1)	21.6 (70.9)	21.3 (70.3)	17.5 (63.5)	13.2 (55.8)	7.9 (46.2)	4.9 (40.8)	12.2 (54.0)
Mean daily minimum °C (°F)	−0.8 (30.6)	−0.4 (31.3)	1.8 (35.2)	3.7 (38.7)	7.5 (45.5)	11.1 (52.0)	13.7 (56.7)	13.6 (56.5)	10.6 (51.1)	7.3 (45.1)	2.6 (36.7)	0.0 (32.0)	5.9 (42.6)
Average precipitation mm (inches)	57.9 (2.28)	48.9 (1.93)	47.8 (1.88)	82.2 (3.24)	76.4 (3.01)	48.6 (1.91)	37.4 (1.47)	43.2 (1.70)	68.2 (2.69)	89.6 (3.53)	89.0 (3.50)	79.3 (3.12)	768.5 (30.26)
Average precipitation days (≥ 1 mm)	10.0	8.7	8.6	11.8	12.5	7.1	6.1	6.4	7.5	10.9	11.3	11.0	111.9
Mean monthly sunshine hours	127	149	196	208	234	273	312	282	218	174	130	116	2,319
Source: World Meteorological Organization (WMO)

== Main sights ==
Jaca boasts several medieval walls and towers surrounding the 11th-century Romanesque Jaca Cathedral.

The Jaca citadel, a fortification dating to the late 16th century, is home to a colony of rock sparrows.

The Diocesan Museum of Jaca (Museum of Medieval Sacred Art) protects Romanesque and Gothic frescos, some of which were found in the most remote locations in the Jaca district.

== Tourism and sports ==
Jaca is a tourist destination in the region for summer holidays and winter sports.

Starting in the early 1970s, the city was transformed from being a small provincial and garrison town to become the gateway to a mid-tier mountain sports area with two major winter resorts (Valle de Astun and Candanchu) within a 30 km (19 mi) drive of the city.

The accompanying urban and infrastructure development in the 1970s and 1980s was controversial, with many claiming that the town lost a lot of its original charm and authenticity to the interests of developers.

The development experienced by the city, with the construction of a nationally known ice-skating rink (the Pista de Hielo del Pirineo), a small convention centre (the Palacio de Congresos) and countless second homes, had a profound impact on the economy of the Valley (Valle del Aragon), where many of its inhabitants evolved from small-scale subsistence farmers in Jaca and the surrounding villages to become part of a tertiary economy.

Jaca was the host city of the 1981 and 1995 Winter Universiades. The city also hosted the 2007 European Youth Olympic Winter Festival. Its popularity for winter sports was a motivating factor in the city's failed bids for the 1998 Winter Olympics, 2002 Winter Olympics and 2010 Winter Olympics, which were awarded to Nagano, Salt Lake City and Vancouver. It was again the applicant city of Spain for the 2014 Winter Olympics, but the bid failed again when it was not selected as a candidate city and the games were ultimately awarded to Sochi.

== Gallery ==
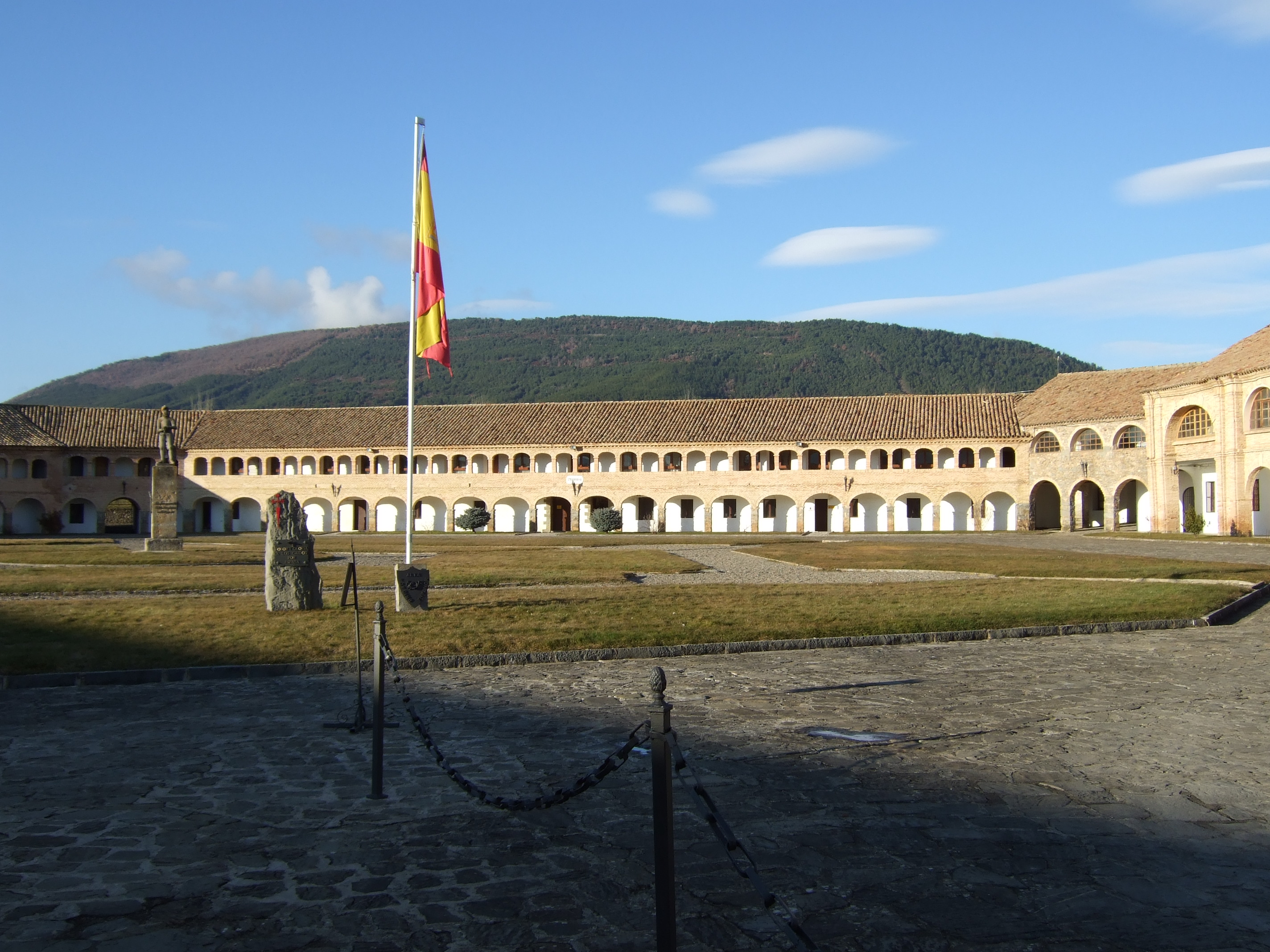
Armour courtyard of the citadel

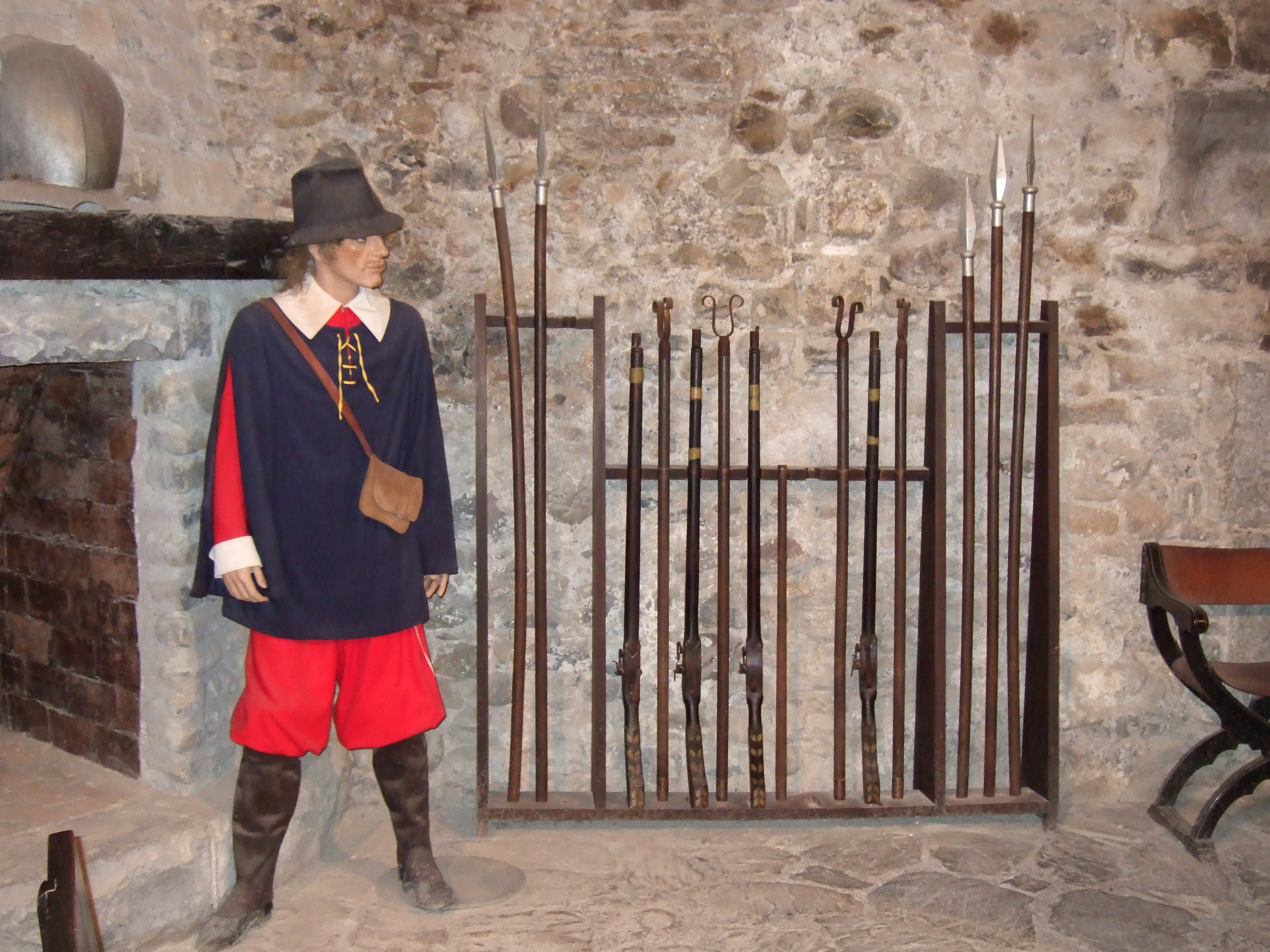
Statues inside the citadel representing the Spanish tercios way of living

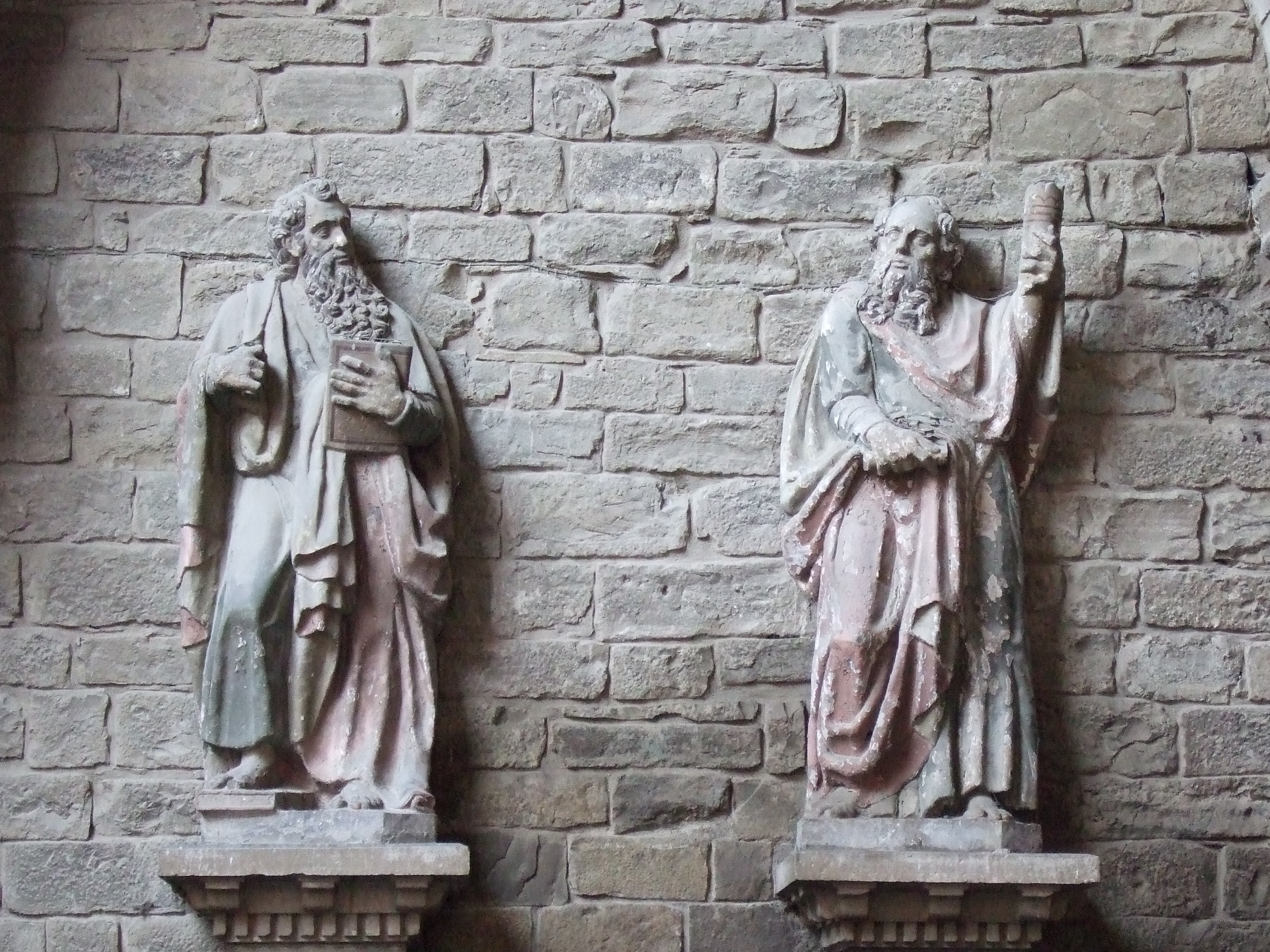
Statues on the west façade of the cathedral

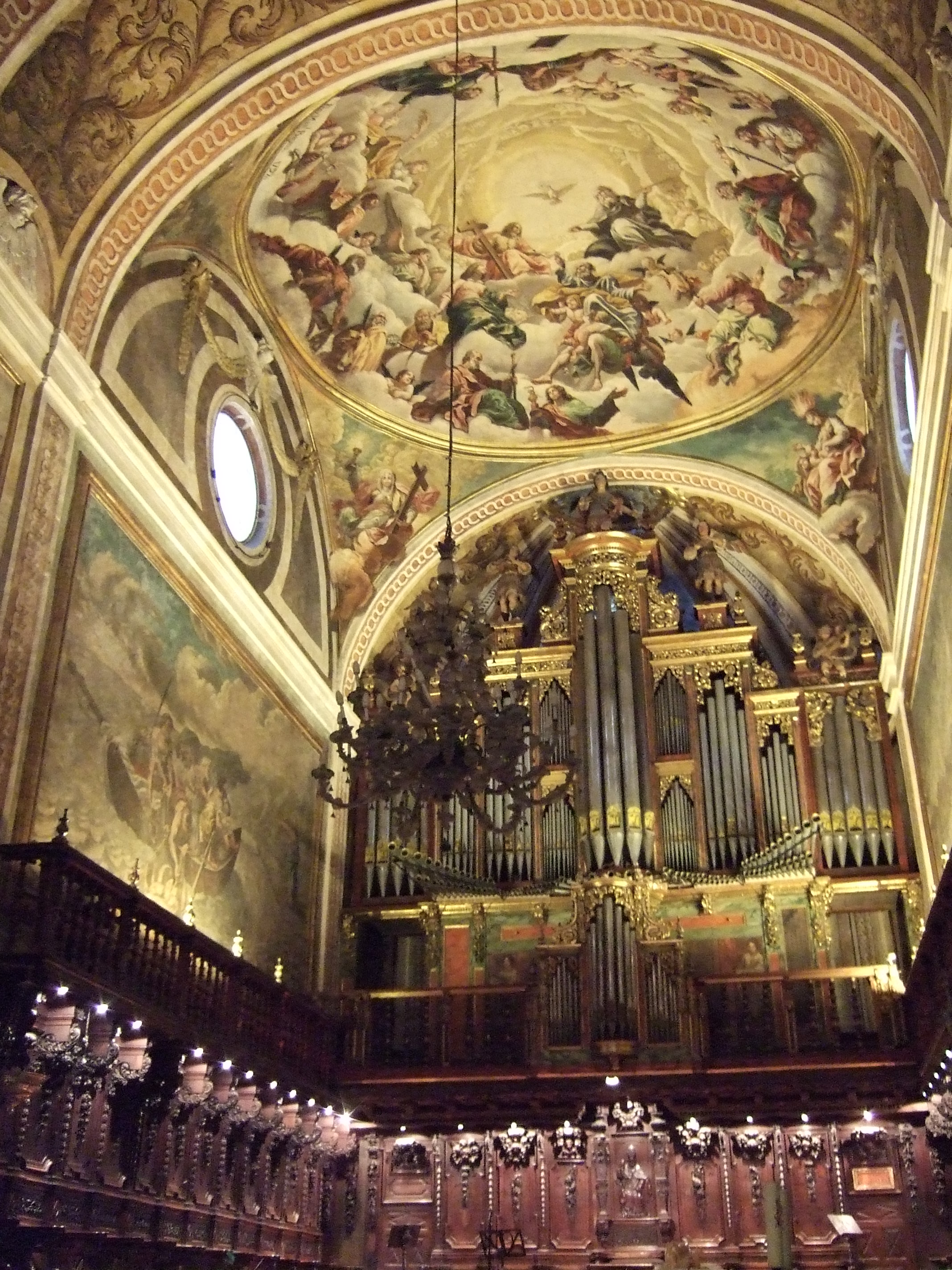
Cathedral, interior

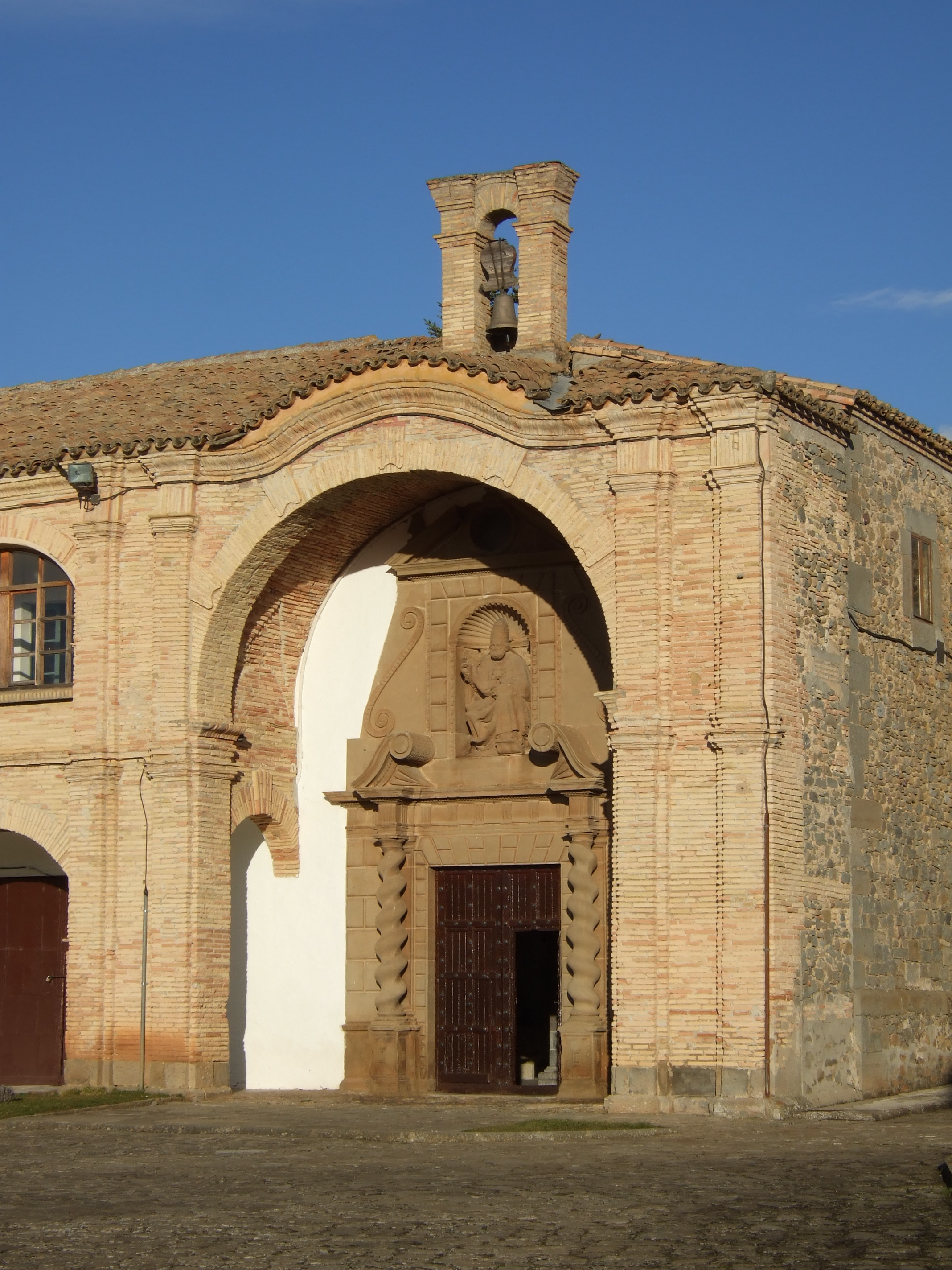
Church of San Pedro

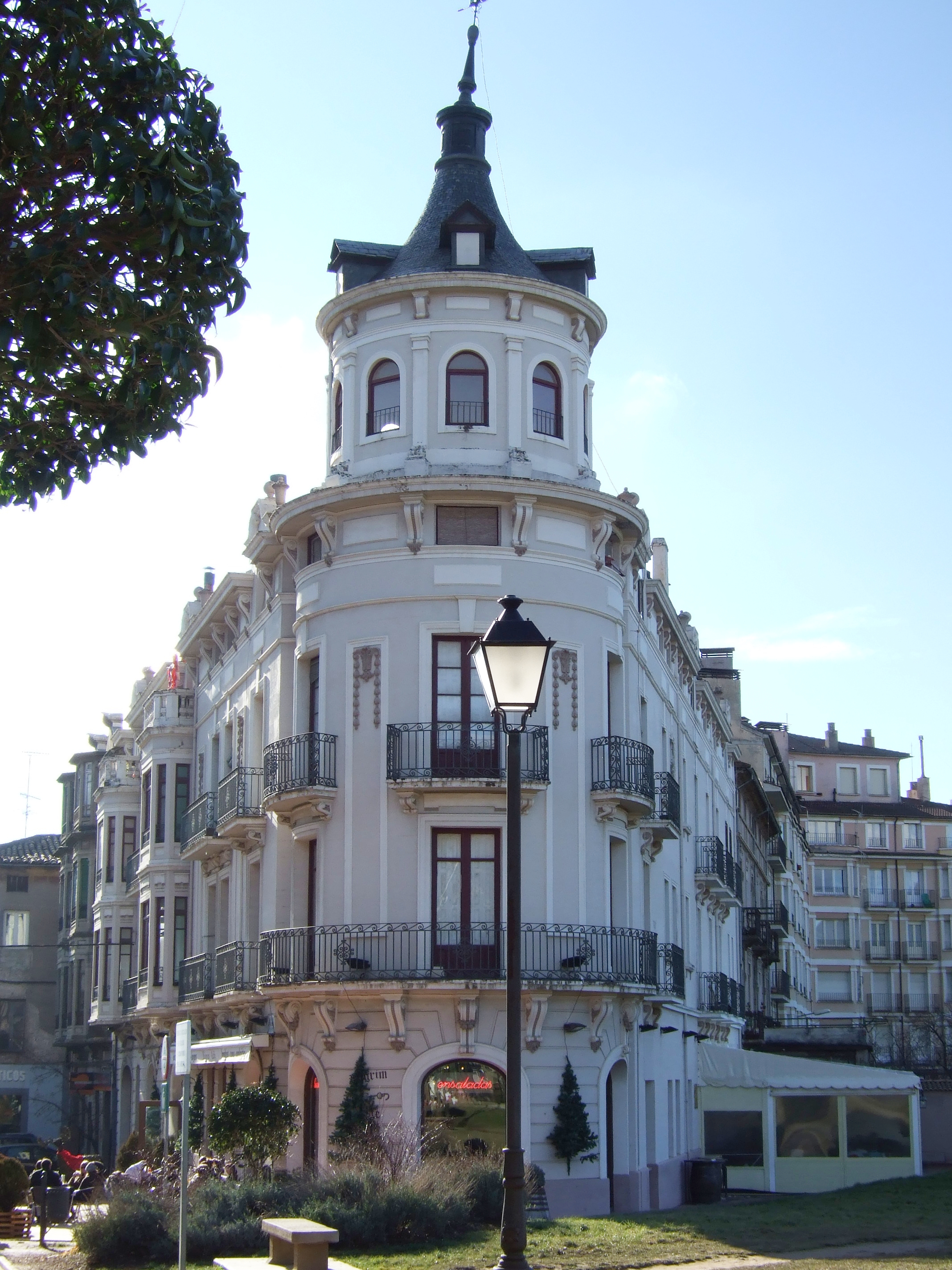
Casa Borau

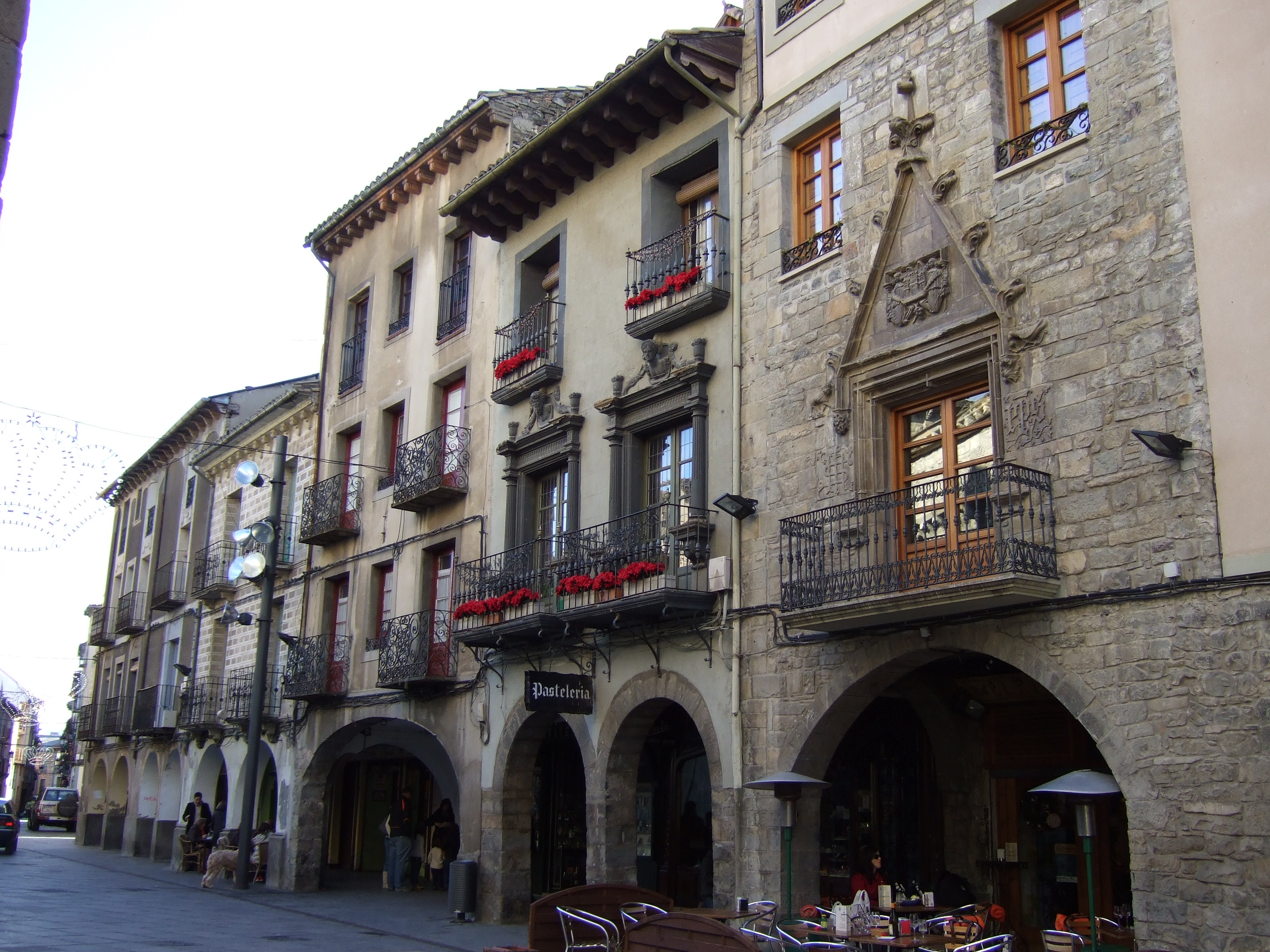
Plaza de la Catedral

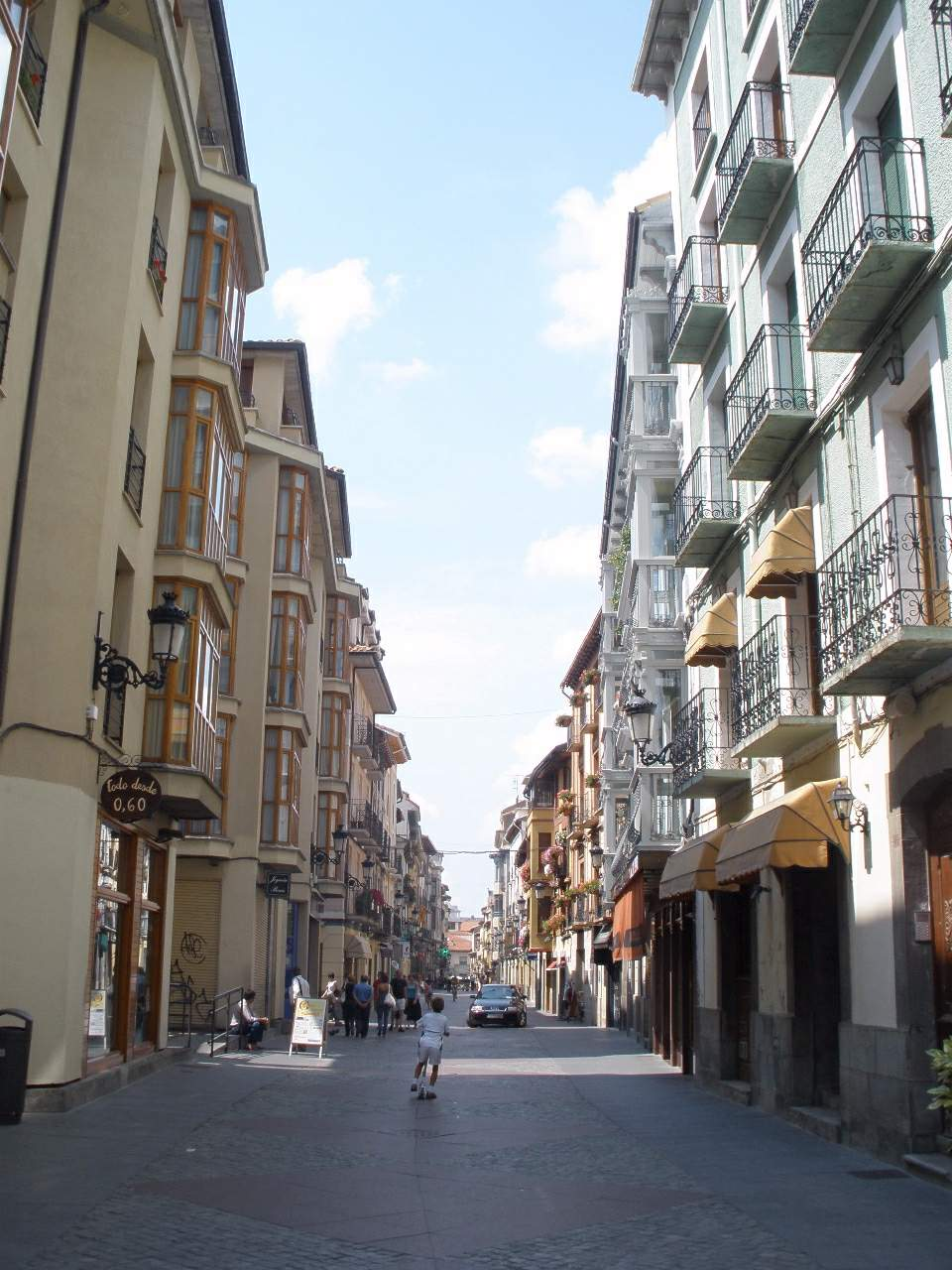
Calle Mayor

== See also ==
- Diocese of Jaca
- Ascara
- Castiello de Jaca
- Larrosa
- Villanovilla
- Bescós de Garcipollera
- Bergosa
- Acín
- List of municipalities in Huesca

Preceded by Canfranc	The Aragonese Way of the Way of St. James	Succeeded by Santa Cruz de la Serós
