= Aragón (river) =

River in northern Spain

Coordinates: 42.60648°N 1.05812°W

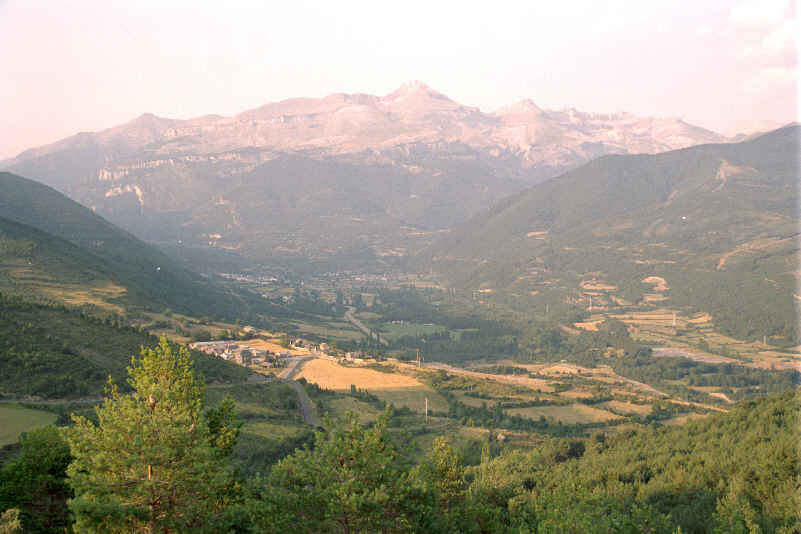
- Aragón river valley in the Huesca province

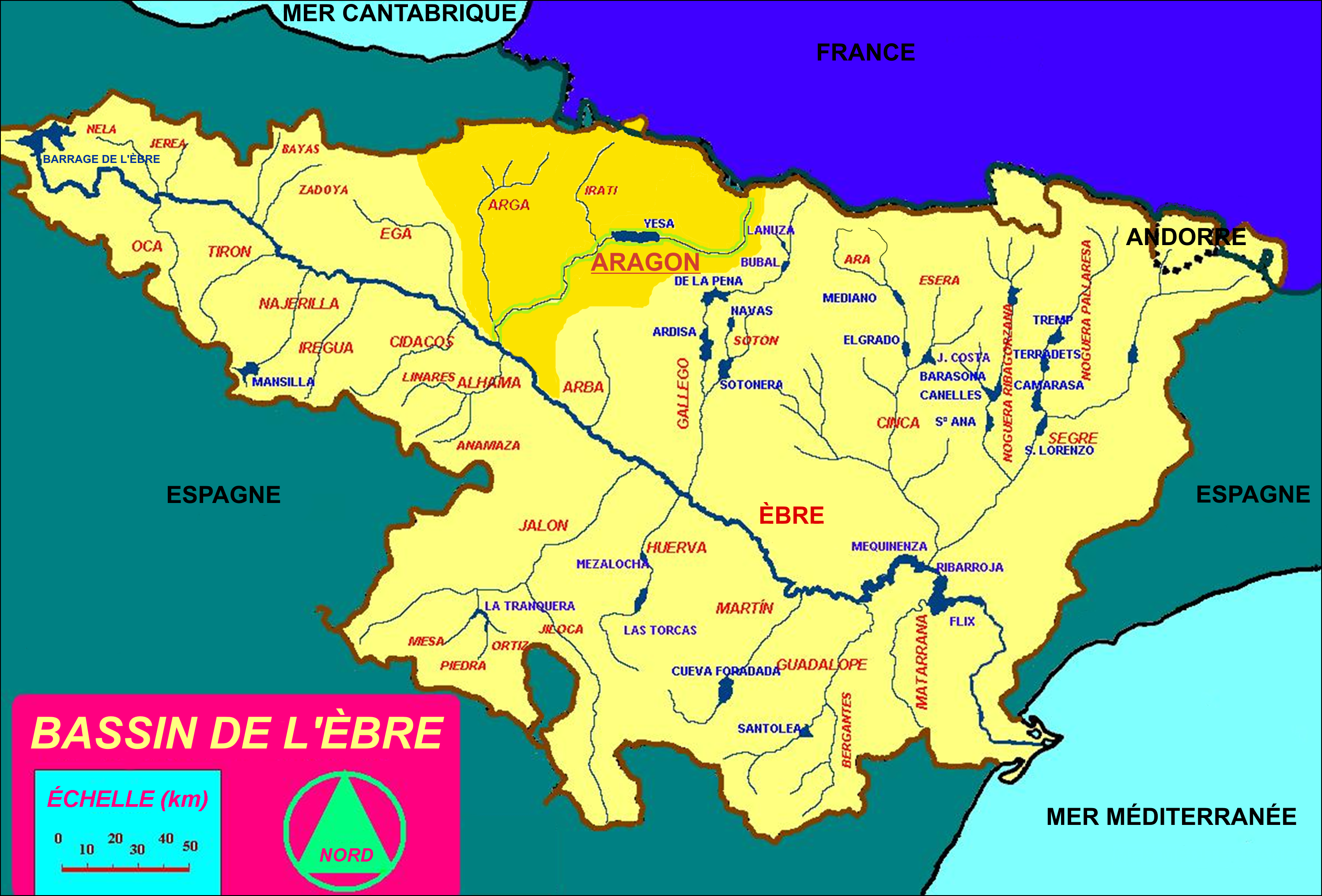
- Watershed of the Aragón (in dark yellow)

Location
- Country: Spain

Physical characteristics
- Source
  - location: Central Pyrenees
- Mouth
  - location: Ebro River

Basin features
- Progression: Ebro→ Balearic Sea

The Aragón (Spanish: Río Aragón; Basque: Aragon Ibaia) is a river in northern Spain, one of the left-hand tributaries of the river Ebro. It rises at Astún (province of Huesca) in the central Pyrenees Mountains, passes southwest through Jaca and Sangüesa (Navarre), and joins the Ebro at Milagro (Navarre), near Tudela. The name Aragón is related to the birth area of the former kingdom, which corresponds to the modern autonomous community of Aragón in Spain.

== Watershed ==
The river, used for irrigation and hydroelectric power, is about 197 kilometres (122 mi) long; its chief tributary is the Arga River.

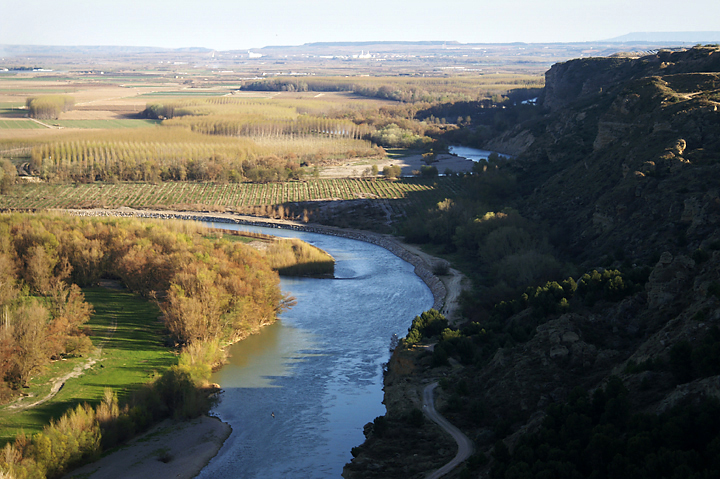
The Aragón flows past the barranco of Peñalén

== Ecology ==
Non-government sanctioned re-introduction of Eurasian beaver (Castor fiber) in Spain around 2003 has resulted in tell-tale beaver signs documented on a 60-kilometre (37 mi) stretch on the lower course of the Aragón River and the area adjoining the Ebro River in Aragon, Spain.

== See also ==
- List of rivers of Spain
