= Yesa Reservoir =

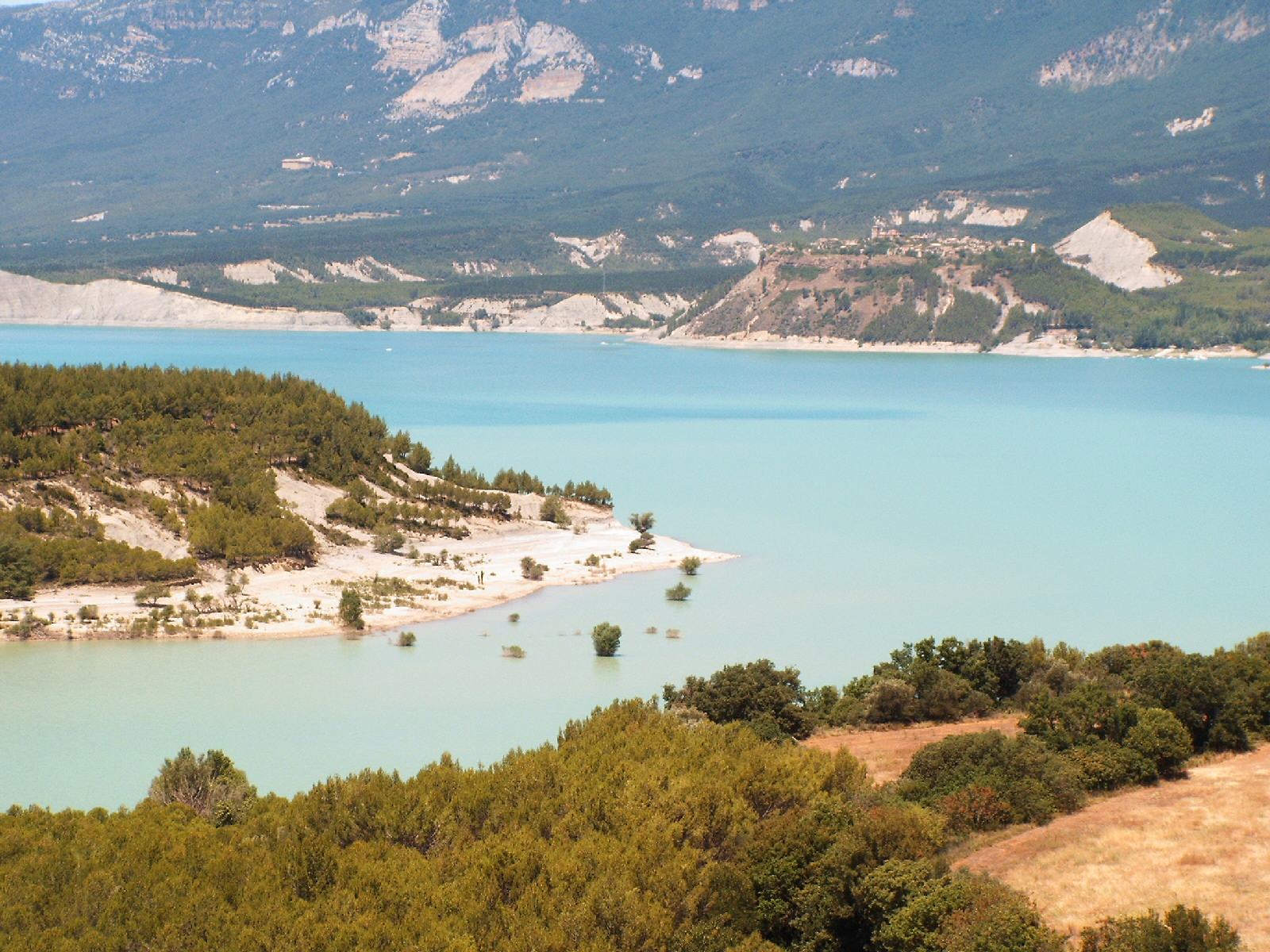
- View of the Yesa swamp from Ruesta

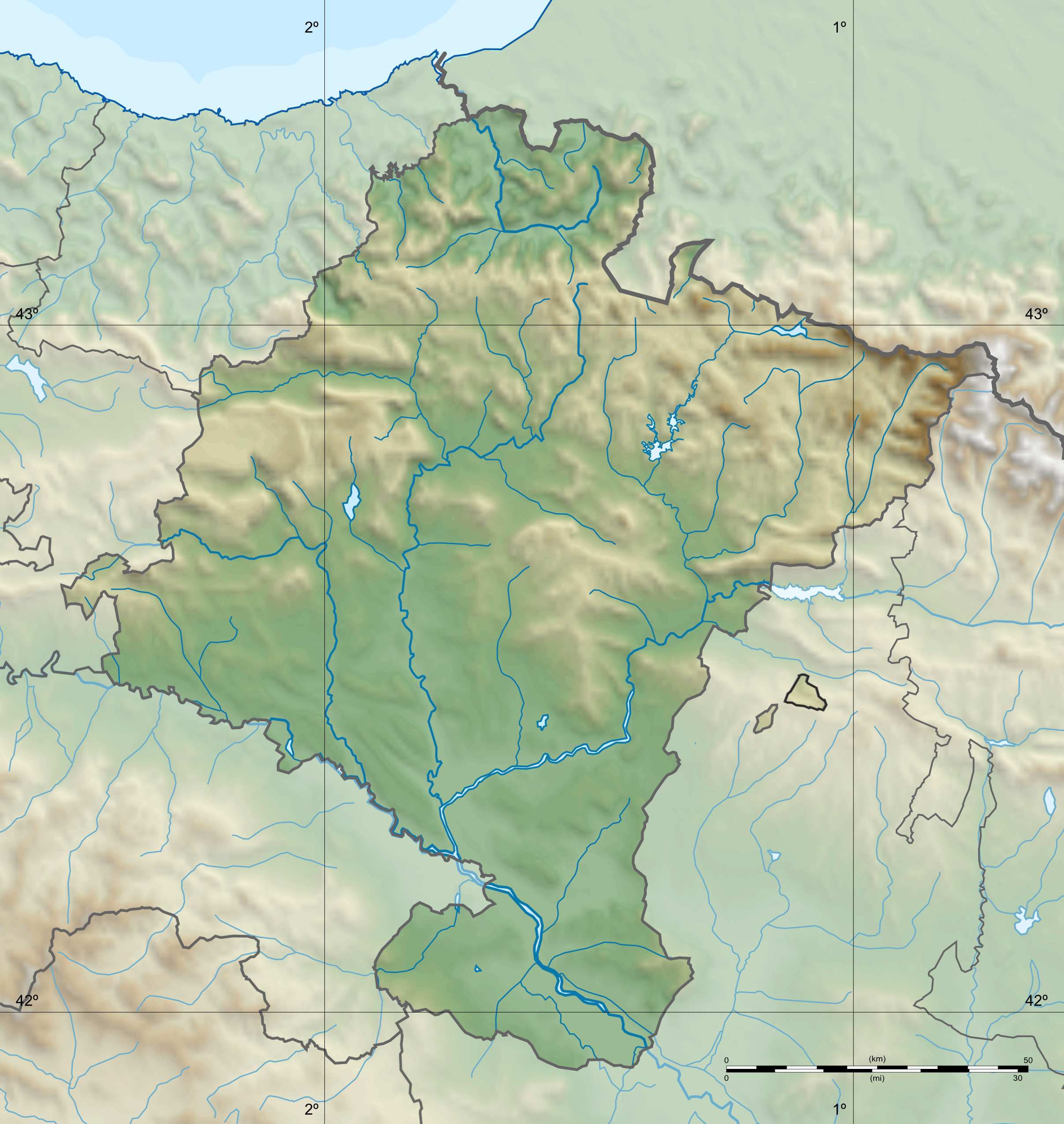
- Location between Navarre and Zaragoza
- Official name: Embalse de Yesa
- Country: Spain
- Location: Navarre; Aragon
- Coordinates: 42°36′55″N 1°10′17″W
- Purpose: Water supply Power
- Opening date: 1959

Dam and spillways
- Type of dam: Gravity dam
- Impounds: Aragón River
- Height: 76 m (249 ft)

Reservoir
- Total capacity: 447 hm^{3} (362,000 acre⋅ft)
- Surface area: 2,089 ha (5,160 acres)

The Yesa Reservoir is located in the Pyrenees, and is formed with the damming of the Aragon River, in the Navarre town of Yesa (Spain), although the largest area of the reservoir is located in the province of Zaragoza, extending from east to west. It is located to the northwest of the Aragonese province of Zaragoza and to the east of Navarre. Most of it floods lands of the Berdun Canal, in the Aragonese region of Jacetania in the municipalities of Sigüés, Ruesta, Escó, and Tiermas. It is known by the nickname Mar de los Pirineos (English: sea of the Pyrenees) and is located at the entrance of the aforementioned. It is the largest navigable area of Aragon and it is the source of the Bardenas Canal that transfers water to the Ribera area south of Navarra and irrigates the Bardenas Reales and the Cinco Villas region of Zaragoza. It is also used for water supply and as a power station.

It has a capacity of 446.86 hm³ (although it has held 488.10 hm³), reaching the following elevations: minimum, 435.00 m; crest, 490.00 m; spillway, 482.61 m and maximum normal reservoir elevation of 488.61 m. The length of the tail end of the reservoir is 10 km with widths varying between 1 and 2.5 km. It occupies an area of 1900 hectares.

It was inaugurated in 1960 and caused the abandonment of several towns: Ruesta, Tiermas, and Escó with an affected population of more than 1500 people. Collaterally, due to the expropriation and planting of pine trees to prevent the siltation of the reservoir, the following upstream towns were affected: Larrosa, Villanovilla, Bescós de Garcipollera, Bergosa, Acín, and, Yosa de Garcipollera in the Garcipollera valley, now belonging to the municipality of Jaca and Cenarbe in Villanúa. 2408 hectares of farmland were flooded, of which 1000 were of very good agricultural quality.

On the other hand, the waters of the Aragón river transferred by the Bardenas canal to the region of Cinco Villas and the Bardenas Reales have led to the creation of 81 107.64 ha of irrigated land, 18 941.61 ha (23.35 %) in the province of Navarra and 62 166.03 ha (76.65%) in the province of Zaragoza, which, together with the supply to the 54 777 inhabitants who depend directly on the system, demand an average annual flow of 467 hm³ of water. This has led to the creation of some fifteen colonization villages, which are home to some 1267 families, many of which come from the villages evicted when the Berdún canal area was flooded. Such is the case of El Bayo, to which many families from Tiermas had to emigrate.

== Dam ==
The dam is located 400 m from the urban center of Yesa in a northerly direction. It is a gravity dam with a straight ground plan built of concrete (480 000 m³ were used) with a vertical slope at the top and a stepped slope, with steps 2 m high and 1,60 m wide at the bottom, which generates a slope of 0,78. It is equipped with a surface spillway located on the left bank and formed by four large mouths (which are striking for their depth as they can be seen from the upper edge), intermediate and bottom drains. It has two intakes for the hydroelectric plant and another for the Bardenas canal.

The length at the crest is 398 m, with a height over foundations of 76.5 m and over the riverbed of 62.1 m; the width at the crest is 7 m, of which 6.5 are dedicated to a road. It consists of a perimeter gallery with five accesses, three of which are at the foot of the dam and the other two at the top, which join at elevation 460 with a horizontal gallery in the abutments, which can be accessed from the dam parameter, next to the intake for the canal.

=== Spillway ===
The dam is equipped with a spillway system consisting of four shafts with independent tunnels of an average length of 600.5 m ending in a common damper for all of them. The four spillways are equipped with concrete gates with a floating sector of 20 m in span and 6 in height. They are located on the left side of the dam. The height of the fixed lip is 482,61 m and they allow outflows of:

- In normal regime, 2240,00 m³/s (560,00 m³/s each span).
- In flood regime, 3060,00 m³/s (765,00 m³/s each span).

=== Drainage ===
- Intermediate: it is located on the intake of the central one foreseen at the foot of the dam at 448,40 m level. They are two conduits of 1 m of diameter. It uses two Howell-Bunger type valves with fixed cone. The capacity of drainage is 38,5 m³/s (19,25 m³/s each one of them).
- At the bottom: they are located at the foot of the dam at an elevation of 428.0 m on the left side, on what was the old bed of the Aragón river. They are two pipes of 1.50 x 2.00 m governed by valves. The total capacity of the outfall is 172 m³/s (86.0 m³/s each).

=== Intakes ===
- Intake of the Bardenas canal: at 453.35 m elevation, located on the left side. It consists of three 2 m diameter pipes governed by ring-seal valves and Tainter type gates. The total normal flow is 90 m³/s (30 m³/s each).
- Intake for power plant at the foot of the dam: it is located at 448.4 m and consists of two pipes of 2.5 m diameter that are governed by wagon gates from the upper part, in the lower part they are closed by a blind flange. The dimensions of the gates are 2,5 x 2,5 m.
- Intake for the power plant next to the Bardenas intake: of the same type as the previous one, consisting of two 3 m diameter pipes. The dimensions of the gates are 3 x 5 m

== Reservoir ==
The reservoir occupies an area of 2098 ha of the Aragón river valley, in the Berdún canal, a length of 18 km, and a shoreline perimeter of 48 km. The surface area of the river basin that corresponds to it is 2170 km^{2}. It has a capacity of 446.90 hm³, of which 411 are usable and 114.60 are for storage. The average annual inflow is 1322 hm³, being the highest recorded flood of 2625 m³/s, while the expected one is 2800 m³/s.

The crest height is 490.9 m, the spillway height is 482.61, while the maximum filling height in normal situation is 488.61 m and 490.00 m in floods. The minimum level of use is 453.35 m, while that of the riverbed is 427.90 m with the bottom outlet at 428.00 m and the intakes of the Bardenas canal at 453.35 m.

The sheet of water can be accessed from the vicinity of the dam, on the left bank, through an entrance that leads to a pebble beach.

== History ==
=== Background ===
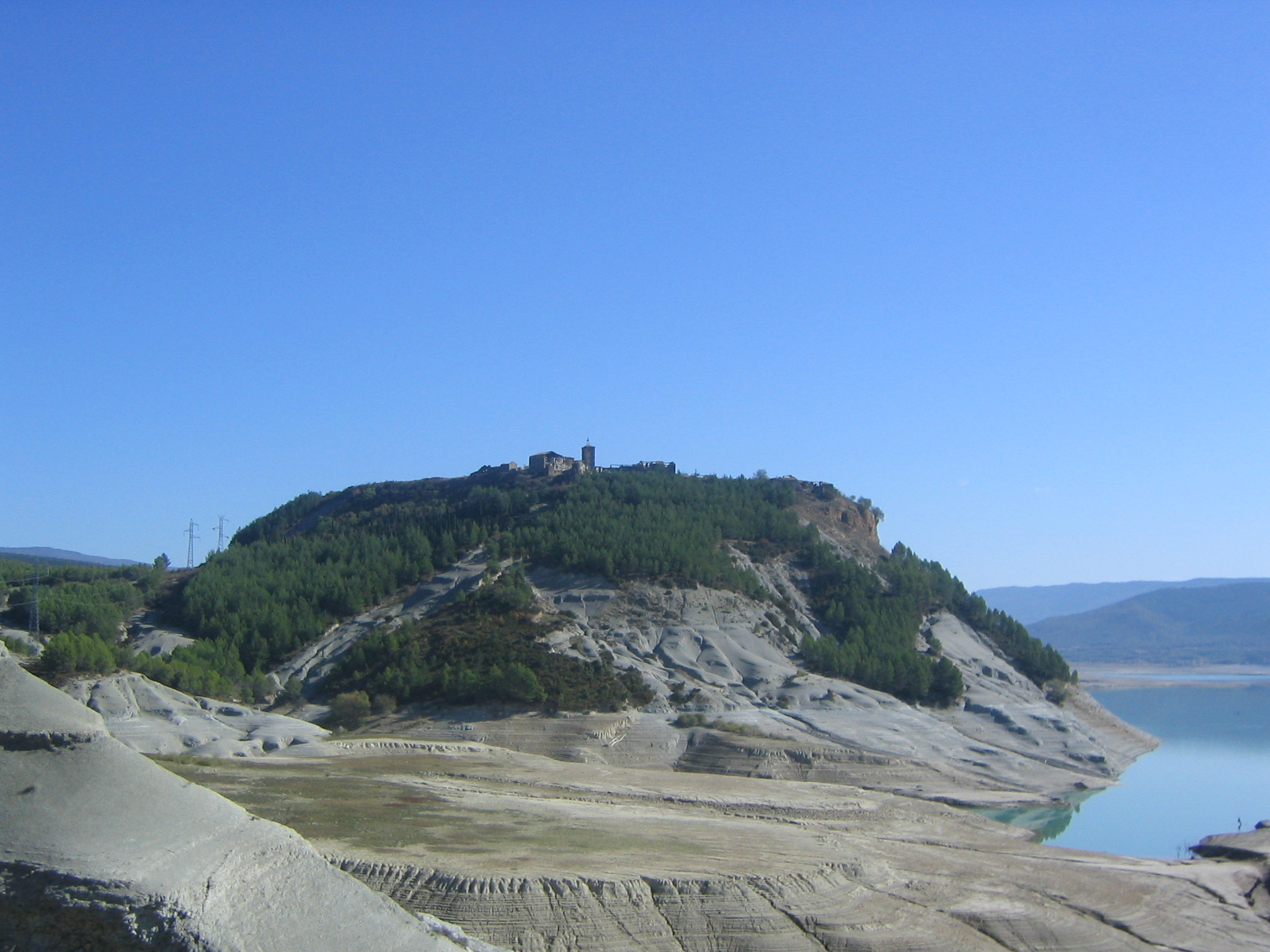
View of Tiermas over the Yesa reservoir.

The use of the Aragón river has been considered since the Middle Ages: as early as 1498 a proposal was made to the King of Aragón Ferdinand the Catholic to divert water from the river for use as irrigation by the Council of Tauste. In 1622, it was proposed to build a canal to Bardenas to irrigate the lands of an abbey that was planned to be built there. In 1702, the engineer Josef Estorguia and a group of hidalgo knights launched the proposal to divert the river so that it would run through Aragonese lands, thus avoiding the payment of tariffs and tolls to the Navarrese. 54 years later, in 1756, a project was drawn up for the construction of a canal that, rising in Tiermas, was to irrigate the Aragonese region of the Cinco Villas. Soon after, another project was presented, this time by Captain J. A. Monroy, who proposed a canal (which was born at a similar level to the current Bardenas) that would irrigate the region of Cinco Villas and Bardenas, with a total of 15,228 ha of irrigated land, as well as the construction of 18 new urban settlements.

In 1865, a company was created for the construction of an irrigation canal to go down to the Bardenas. The project was carried out by Antonio de Lesarri. The society would be in charge of the construction in exchange for the use of the water and the irrigators paying the corresponding alfardas. (Note: alfarda f. A certain contribution paid by Moors and Jews in the Christian kingdoms. Real Academia Española. "alfarda" (in Spanish).) In 1880 the concession was declared null and void, since the works had not begun.

In 1902, a Royal Decree of 25 April proposed a National Plan of Hydraulic Works in which a hydraulic complex appeared, consisting of the Bardenas de Yesa, Foz de Biniés, Salvatierra, and Usún canals, each of them with a reservoir. This complex would generate an irrigated area of 30,000 ha in several towns of Navarre and Zaragoza. The reservoirs would be located as follows: Yesa, where the current one is located; Foz de Biniés in the waters of the Veral river; Salvatierra, on the Ezka River, Usún would be located in the Salazar Valley, 6 km from Lumbier. Along with this proposal were also those of the Canal Imperial de Aragón and the Lodosa Canal, which made the need to dam the Aragón and its tributaries more evident.

On 2 March 1909, the Ebro Hydraulic Division was commissioned to study the project for the Yesa Dam. This project was carried out by the engineers Cornelio Arellano, first, and then Manuel Abascal, who completed it in 1912. The canal project was not approved until 1917. The dam designed was a 53-meter-high gravity dam.

=== Project ===
In 1923, a new project was commissioned, drafted by the engineers Félix de los Ríos, Mariano Vicente, and Antonio Colom, who carried out the study based on an irrigable area of 130,000 ha, to contribute to the Ardisa dam with 400,000 million cubic meters per year and to supply drinking water to Zaragoza. This proposal was included in the linking of the three large rivers on the left side of the Ebro, the Aragón, the Gállego, and the Cinca.

On 7 May 1926, a Royal Order approved the Yesa Dam project, making it compulsory to respect the uses and exploitations downstream of the dam. The same team that conceived the dam also planned the Bardenas canal, presenting their work on 29 December 1924. This would be approved eight years later, on 30 June 1932, by a Resolution of the General Directorate of Hydraulic Works. In 1926, it was estimated that Yesa reservoir would only be used for irrigating of the Bardenas and the Cinco Villas region, and its possible contribution to the Imperial Canal of Aragón was rejected. In the 1st General Plan of Works and Miscellaneous Works of the Ebro Hydrographic Confederation, in 1926, the construction of Yesa reservoir was proposed. This would have a capacity of 470 hm^{3}; destined for the Bardenas canal and the irrigation of the farming area of the basin itself, some 15 000 ha, although the possibility of contributing to the Imperial canal was still being discussed so that this would free up resources for the Lodosa canal. The forecasts for the Bardenas canal, which, starting from Yesa, was to reach Ardisa, were for a dam outlet of 60 m^{3};/s, of which 39 would reach Ardisa.

=== Execution ===
In the II Works Plan of the Confederation, which was published the following year, the works were delayed as it was considered that the studies on the regime, flow and layout of the canal and the capacity of the reservoir had not been carried out properly. That same year the Agronomic Service of the Hydrographic Confederation prepared and published a study in which it foresaw the conversion of 80 000 ha to intensive irrigation and another 30 000 ha to semi-intensive irrigation. For this purpose, it estimated that 619 952 hm^{3};/year of water were needed, with incidence of use in the summer months.

On 13 November 1928, the foundation works for the dam, which had been put out to tender in the third Works and Works Plan, began. With respect to the Bardenas canal, it was decided to reconsider the route.

In 1931, the Yesa swamp project was carried out, which was a complement to the 1924 project. It defined the body of the dam and everything related to it, such as the outlets and intakes. By then, the problems that had arisen with the settlement of the right abutment and the doubts about the capacity of the inflows had already been solved. This project was approved on 30 June 1934. In 1933, the contract with the builders was terminated due to different problems. By that date the Bardenas Canal was already under construction.

After the Civil War, during which the works were halted, they were resumed with the construction of the variant of the race in 1940 and the excavation of the right slope. In 1945, under the direction of René Petit, two reforms of the project were carried out, the first one was approved by Ministerial Order on February 6 and the second and definitive one on September 15. The uses to be given to the Yesa water were definitively designated, which were the same as those foreseen in the Félix de los Ríos project, but the irrigable surface area was reduced to 110,000 hectares. The reservoir was inaugurated in 1959 and in 1960 came into service.

The closure of the gates of the Yesa dam caused the abandonment of several villages, Ruesta, Tiermas, and Escó, with an affected population of more than 1,500 people and flooded the valley leaving 2,400 ha of arable land under water, of which 1,000 were of excellent quality. The 8528 ha that were expropriated in the affected municipalities were distributed among the municipalities of Sigüés, with 3,752; Urriés, with 1,498 ha, Undués de Lerda, with 1,754 ha and Los Pintanos, with 1,524 ha, the latter belonging to the Cinco Villas region. A collateral effect was the purchase by the Patrimonio Forestal del Estado of the valley of La Garcipollera, which leads to Castiello de Jaca, by means of a decree of forced repopulation to plant laricio pine to prevent erosion and silting of the reservoir. This led to the abandonment of the villages of Larrosa, Villanovilla, Bescós de Garcipollera, Bergosa, Acín de Garcipollera, Cenarbe, and Yosa de Garcipollera.

== Yesa's heightening ==
In the 1970s, the idea of a new regulation of the Aragón and Irati basins arose and, after various proposals, the proposal to heighten the Yesa dam was adopted. In 1983, a first project was presented which aimed to achieve a new reservoir with a capacity of 1,525 hm^{3} (three times the current one) making it a hyperannual reservoir (whose cycle is greater than one season). This project was rejected by the Dirección General de Obras Hidráulicas. Ten years later, in 1993, the Modified Project 03/1993 was presented, which maintains similar technical characteristics to the previous one with a heightening level of 521 m and a volume of water of 1,525 hm^{3}.

The purpose of the dammed water would be for the maintenance of current and future irrigation, as well as the supply of drinking water to Zaragoza and its surroundings and the maintenance of concessions and the ecological flow of the Aragón River. The heightening would entail the disappearance of the urban center of Sigüés and the expropriation of important areas of the municipalities of Artieda and Mianos.

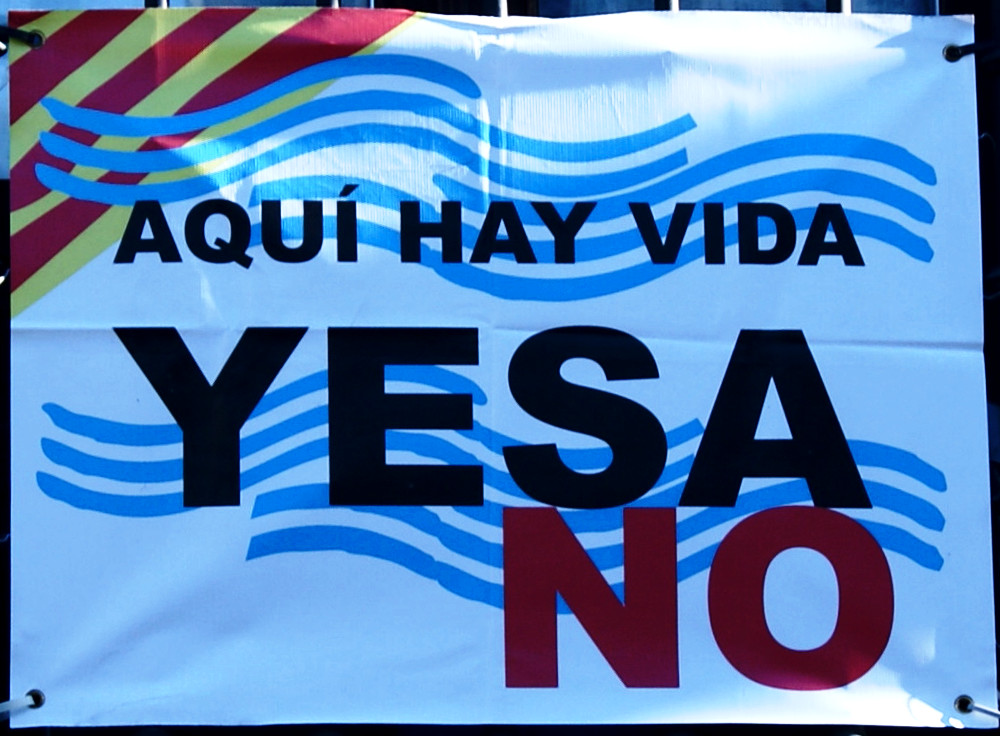
In English: "There is life here, Yesa no."

The heightening encountered great social opposition in the affected towns, while in those benefited by the increase in irrigated land it is supported. The works began in May 2001, although they had been affected by problems in the consolidation of the left bank, where large cracks appeared in 2004 and in 2006, there was a landslide of 3.5 million cubic meters that threatened to fall into the reservoir. In 2007, cracks and holes reopened and the track along the left slope collapsed.

Since a plan to increase the height of the Yesa dam was made public in 1983, various actions have been carried out to oppose the project by several affected associations led by the Asociación Río Aragón and COAGRET, together with environmental associations such as Ecologistas en Acción, Greenpeace, SEO/BirdLife, WWF/Adena, AEMS-Ríos con Vida, Amigos de la Tierra, and others, which make up the platform "Yesa No".

The sectors that oppose these works affirm that the tripling of the damming capacity of the Yesa river would lead to serious effects on the natural environment, flooding the urban area of Sigüés and an important area of farmland affecting protected areas such as Foz de Sigüés. They also point out that there are serious geological problems, especially on the left slope of the Aragón river, which could even affect the integrity of the new dam. The historical and artistic heritage of the region would be affected since the waters would flood part of the Camino de Santiago, also affecting different Roman and medieval sites. In defense of these criteria, five legal actions have been carried out, three administrative lawsuits, a criminal complaint against three former senior officials of the Ministry of Environment, and a complaint for destruction of Historic-Artistic Heritage in reference to the Camino de Santiago which has also been denounced before Unesco.

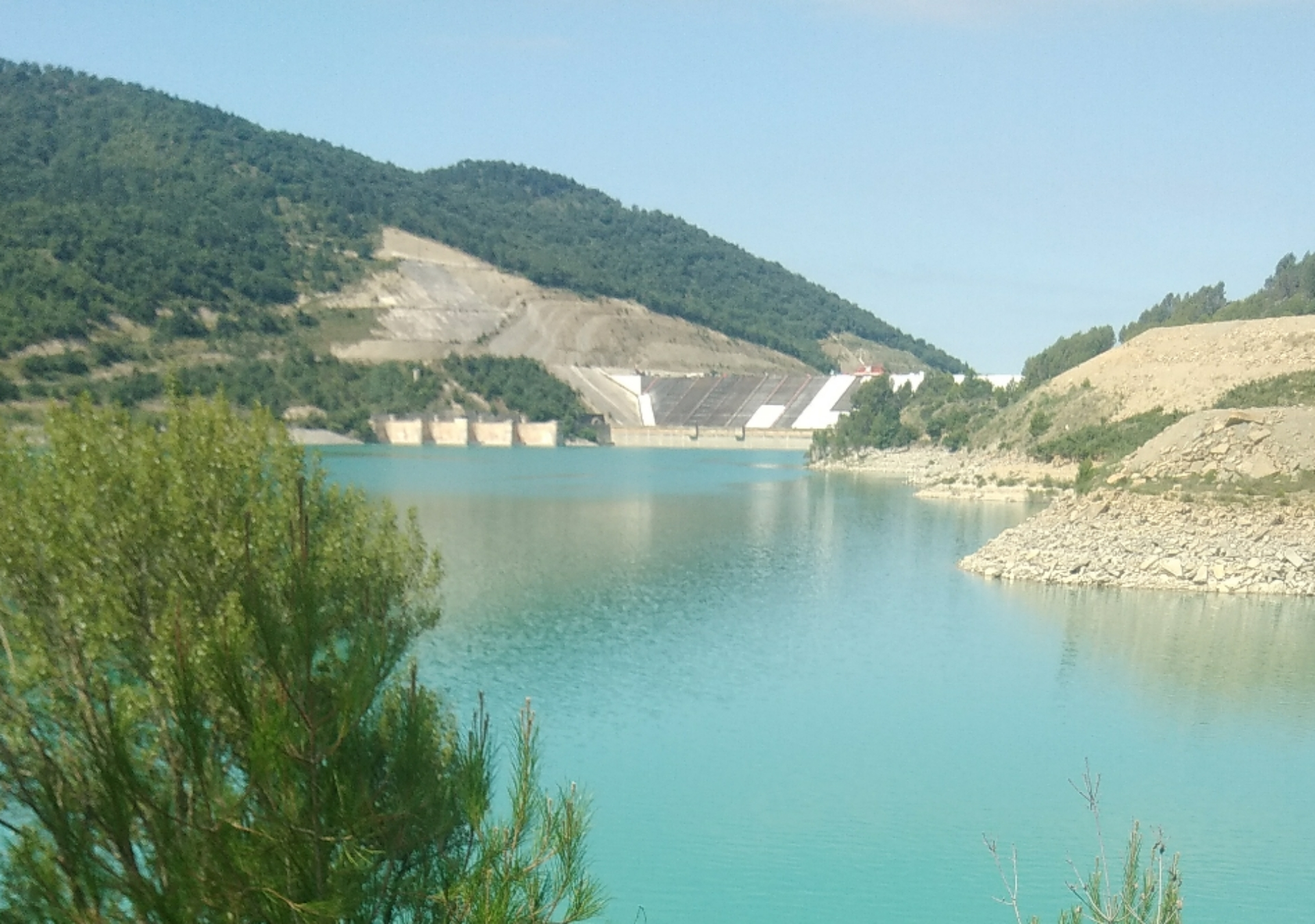
Yesa Dam in June 2021. In the foreground is the old dam and behind it, on an inclined plane, the heightening works.

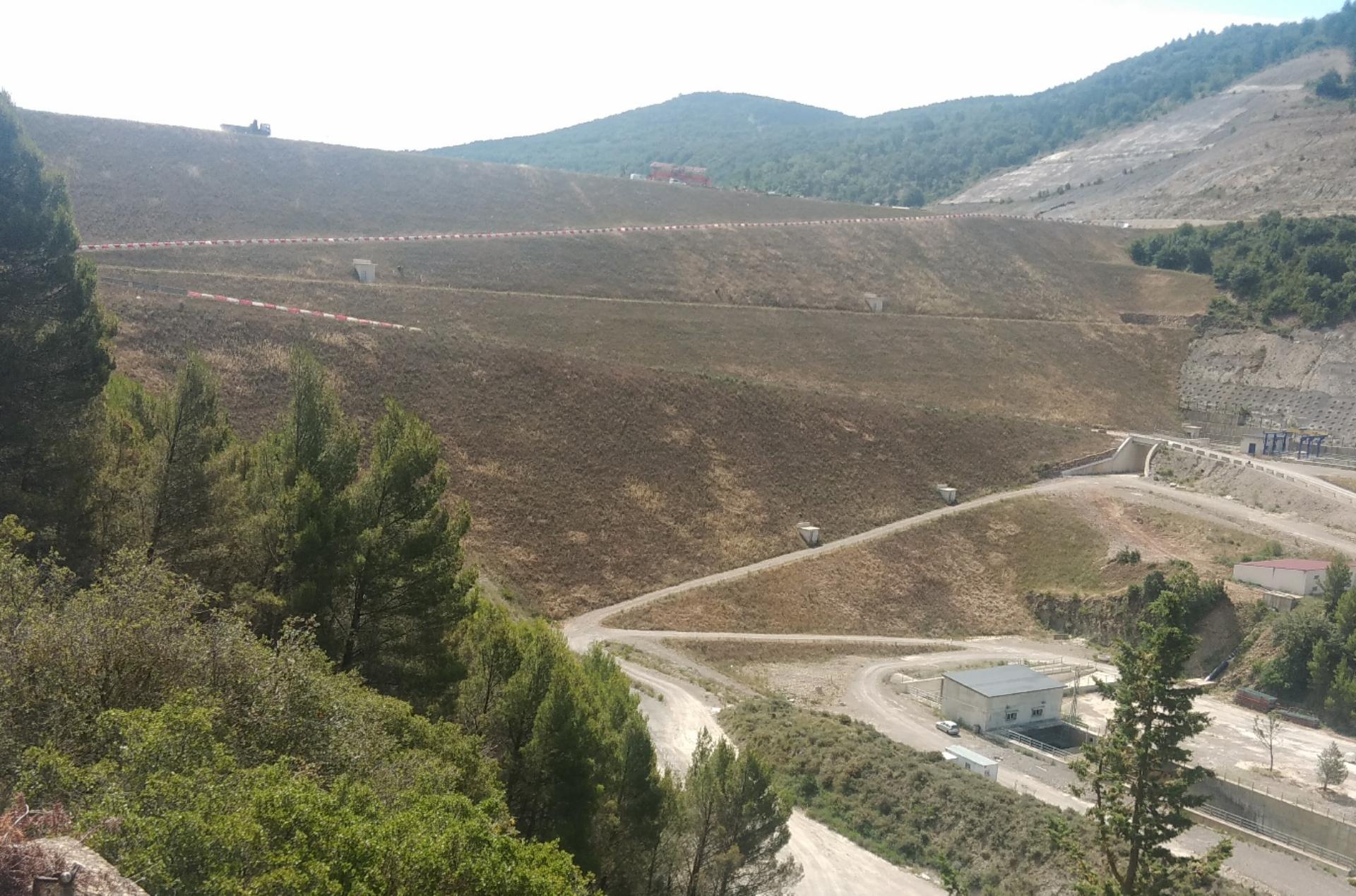
Yesa Dam in June 2021. Later part: the heightening has hidden the original dam.

The legal actions were sentenced between 2006 and 2007 and all of them were adverse to the plaintiffs, declaring innocent and acquitting those responsible for the works and giving free rein to the heightening of the reservoir through the construction of the new dam. Judgment number 43/2006 related to the abbreviated proceeding number 5/2005 ruled as follows:

That we must absolve and acquit Patricia, Lucio, Gonzalo, Rubén, Darío, and Rafael of the crimes of prevarication, catastrophic risk, negotiations and activities prohibited to public officials, against historical and archaeological heritage, against natural resources and the environment, and falsification of public documents, of which they have been accused.

and the resolution of November 27 of 2007 by the Audiencia Nacional on appeal no. 121/01 filed by the Artieda Town Council and the Río Aragón Association against the decisions of the Ministry of the Environment dismissed the appeal and gave permission to the work. Together with the Ministry, the following organizations were defendants: the General Communities of Bardenas, Riegos del Alto Aragón and the UTE of construction companies awarded the work tender. The ruling reads as follows:

DISMISSAL of the contentious-administrative appeal filed by the Town Council of Artieda de Aragón (Zaragoza) and the Legal Association against the extension of the Yesa reservoir "RÍO ARAGÓN" represented by the Attorney Isacio Calleja García against the resolutions of the Ministry of the Environment dated 12 and 20 December 2000; without imposition of costs.

In this judgment, the points denounced are, one by one, dismissed.

In the midst of the controversy, several proposals for an alternative to the dam's heightening emerged. In 2004, the Fundación Nueva Cultura del Agua (English: New Water Culture Foundation) presented a sustainable alternative to Yesa's heightening, which offers a guarantee of acceptable supply to the present and future agricultural requirements of Bardenas, more economical, with less environmental impact and which generates less social conflict. It was based on the construction of lateral reservoirs to the Bardenas irrigation system.

Another proposal was to lower the height of the heightening, limiting it to between 510 m and 512 m, which would leave the capacity of the reservoir at 1,100 m^{3}. This proposal would be completed with other small actions to mitigate the damage caused, such as the construction of a wall around Sigüés. It is estimated, according to a study by the Universidad de Alcalá de Henares, that this reservoir capacity would be sufficient to meet the demands and needs described above.

On 4 January 2011, it is published in the Official State Gazette (BOE) the award of auxiliary works not included in the heightening project for an amount of 24,209,381 euros to the joint venture formed by ACS Proyectos Obras y Construcciones S. A., Ferrovial Agroman S. A., and FCC Construcción. These works consisted of: stabilization of the right bank of the dam and improvement of the waterproofing and drainage of the right abutment support, thus increasing the safety of the area; conditioning of the land for the access road to the crest on the left bank; construction of 1,580 meters of auxiliary construction of the Bardenas canal; replacement of the electrical supply connection to the dam and plant regeneration by spreading topsoil and subsequent hydroseeding.

In 2013, new cracks appeared on the right slope of the reservoir, in view of this fact the association Río Aragón, opposed to the dam's heightening, has pointed out that "geologists have repeatedly warned that these landslides are not going to stop occurring"

== Development ==
=== Tourist sports ===
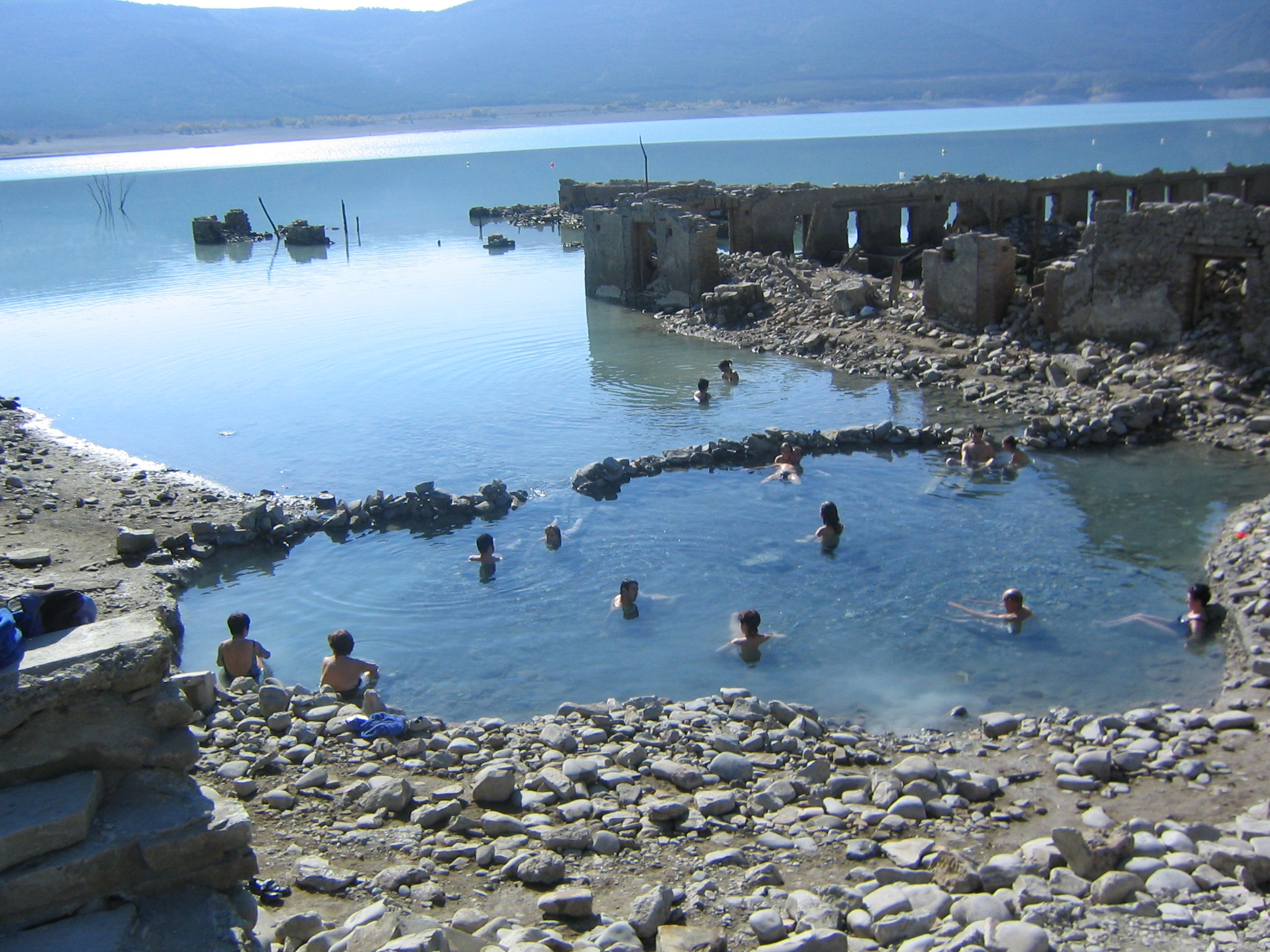
Area of sulfurous water baths in the old spa of Tiermas.

The climatology of the area where the reservoir is located is mild, with more sunny days than in the Cuenca de Pamplona. It is worth mentioning the north wind (cierzo) which enters in gusty form from the mountains, reaching force 5, as well as the more frequent south wind. This wind characteristic makes it very favorable for sailing, especially with light boats and windsurfing.

The richness of fish in the waters of the Aragón river, with abundance of trout, carp, and American perch makes the banks of the reservoir a very popular place for fishing enthusiasts.

The location of the reservoir, at the foot of the Leire Range and the fact that its right bank is bordered by the N-240 road makes hiking and cycling activities highly recommended. The Camino de Santiago passes along its banks and nearby there are many places with relevant buildings such as the monastery of Leyre or the Castle of Xavier or the bridge of the Roncaleses of Roman origin and rebuilt in the 11th century.

Some of the villages on the banks of the Aragón river have been abandoned since the construction of the dam and the subsequent filling of the reservoir flooded the valley's farmland. In Tiermas, among the ruins, an alternative social experience has arisen as a result of the concern of a group of young people. The same happens in Ruesta, which has been ceded for exploitation to the trade union Confederación General del Trabajo de España.

Before the filling of the reservoir, there was a famous spa that took advantage of the sulfurous water springs there and that had been used since times before the Roman Empire conquest. The waters gush forth at a temperature of 42 °C. The installations, whose level is below the filling level of the reservoir, reappear during periods of time when the level of the reservoir is low. Many people take advantage of this circumstance to continue using these waters and the mud that is formed, which has therapeutic properties for the skin.

=== Agricultural ===
In the area of the reservoir, agricultural activity continues to be one of the pillars of the economy. The farms are, in general, of cereal monoculture (90%) which is complemented with leguminous crops and vegetable gardens dedicated almost entirely to their own consumption. The Confederación Hidrográfica del Ebro owns about 20% of the arable land, which it managed unilaterally until 1983, when it ceded these lands to the municipalities of Artieda, Mianos, and Sigüés for a period of ten years.

Livestock farming is focused on the sheep sector with approximately 5,000 head distributed in six flocks. The livestock is fed in the large areas of scrubland and forest that occupy almost 60% of the land. A very high part of the labor force employed is foreign, since the population of the area is highly aged and there has been a very high rate of management by state agencies, the Confederación Hidrográfica del Ebro and the ICONA, which has inhibited the initiative of the native settlers.

A new activity is that derived from reforestation, carried out to protect the land from erosion. In the forests that have been created, the exploitation of hunting preserves and for mushroom hunting is taking place.

In the regions of Cinco Villas and Bardenas, where the water from the Aragón river is transferred through the Bardenas Canal, it irrigates some 70,000 hectares. This irrigated agriculture is mainly cereal. Currently, it is possible to plant fruit trees and olive trees due to a change that took place in the ordinances in 2007.

=== Industrial ===
Although an industrial use of the Yesa reservoir was foreseen for electricity production at the foot of the dam, the power plant has never been built. However, in the Bardenas Canal there are several mini-power plants, managed by the Bardenas Irrigation Community, which use the water transferred from the Aragón to generate electricity.

== See also ==
- List of dams and reservoirs in Spain
- List of submerged places in Spain
- Camino de Santiago
- Ruesta
- Bardenas
- Tiermas
- Larrosa
- Villanovilla
- La Garcipollera (valley)
- Cenarbe
- Ebro Hydrographic Confederation
