= Autovía A-21 =

Road in Spain

Autovía A-21
- Autovía del Pirineo
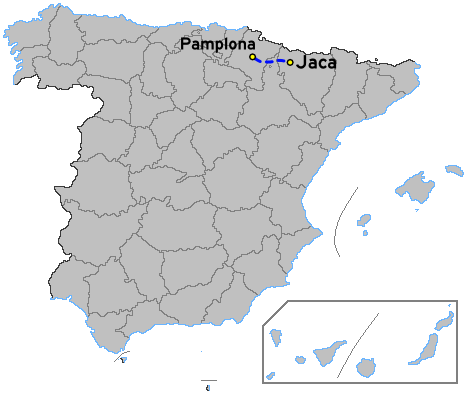

Route information
- Length: 110 km (68 mi)

Major junctions
- From: Iruña/Pamplona
- To: Jaca

Location
- Country: Spain

Highway system
- Highways in Spain; Autopistas and autovías; National Roads

The Spanish Autovía A-21 is a highway between Jaca, in Aragon, and Iruña/Pamplona, in Navarre which is partially open and partially under construction.

It follows or is an upgrade of the N-240 and links the Autovía A-15 east of Iruña/Pamplona with the Autovía A-23 at Jaca providing a link through the southern Pyrenees and connections to France, Huesca and Zaragoza.

== Phases ==
Construction began at the Iruña/Pamplona end of the route, so while the sections in Navarre were completed by 2012, only seven out of the eight sections in Aragon (totaling about 38 km) are open. Work has not yet started on one further section (11.6 km). Seven financial institutions funded the construction of the highway.

Road Number	Description	Status (2025)	Kilometres
A-21	Noain - Elo/Monreal	Open (2006)	12
A-21	Elo/Monreal - Izko	Open (2009)	8.6
A-21	Izko - Judasen Benta/Venta de Judas	Open (2010)	7.2
A-21	Judasen Benta/Venta de Judas - Esa/Yesa	Open (2012)	10
A-21	Esa/Yesa- Border of Navarre/Aragón	Open (2012)	6.5
A-21	Border of Navarre/Aragón - Tiermas	Open (2013)	4.4
	Tiermas - Sigüés	Open (2025)	6.57
	Sigüés - A-1601	Open (2015)	2.5
A-21	A-1601 - Barranco de Colladas	Open (2011)	2.9
A-21	Barranco de Colladas - Fago (Border of Zaragoza/Huesca)	Open (2011)	5.4
	Fago (Border of Zaragoza/Huesca) - Puente la Reina de Jaca	Project halted	11.63
	Puente la Reina de Jaca - Santa Cilia	Open (2019)	7.2
A-21	Santa Cilia - Jaca (A-23)	Open (2019)	9.0
