= Escó =

Coordinates: 42°37′10″N 1°03′20″W

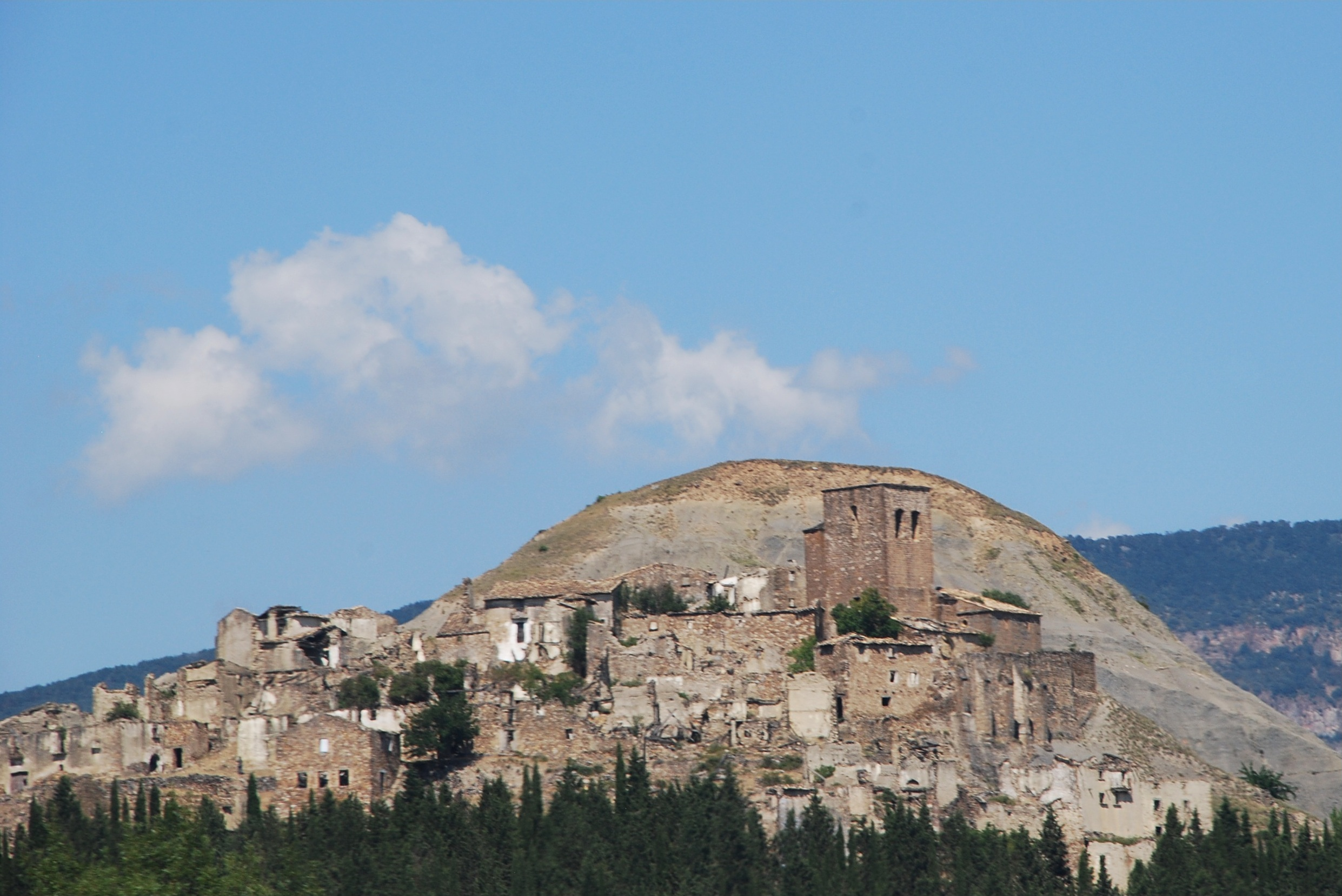
Escó

Escó, or in local Aragonese Esco, is an almost deserted village in the region of Jacetania, province of Zaragoza, Aragon, Spain, located next to the Yesa Reservoir.

Esco, along with Sigüés, Ruesta, and Tiermas were largely abandoned in 1960 with the creation of the Yesa Dam, flooding much of the surrounding farmland.
