= Tiermas =

Uninhabited settlement in the Province of Zaragoza, Spain

- Uninhabited settlement
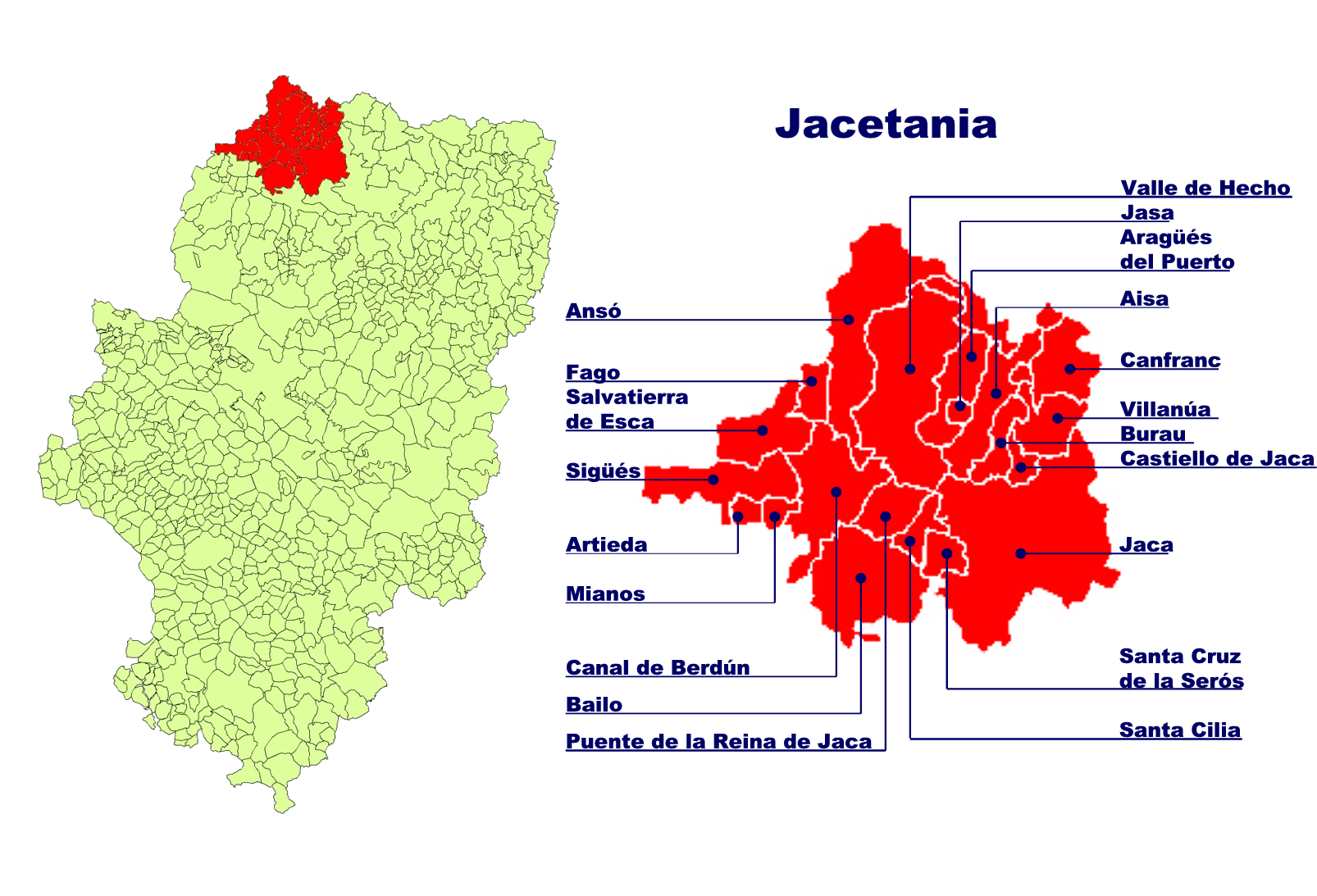
- Coordinates: 42°36′54″N 1°06′59″W
- Country: Spain
- Autonomous community: Aragón
- Province: Zaragoza
- Comarca: Jacetania
- Municipality: Sigüés
- Highest elevation: 580 m (1,900 ft)

Population
  - Total: 0

Tiermas is an uninhabited settlement in the province of Zaragoza, in Aragon (Spain), belonging to the municipality of Sigüés in the comarca de Jacetania. It is on the banks of the Aragón river next to the Yesa Reservoir that partly floods it.

Of what was the old village, only the upper part of it remains, since the lower part has disappeared under the waters, as has most of its municipal district, along with those of Escó and Ruesta. The construction of the reservoir led to the expropriation by the regime of the entire village, including orchards and farmlands, except for two neighbors who remained in the village until the day of his death.

Currently, its former neighbors and descendants are working for the reversion and reconstruction of the village, still hoping that one day justice will give them the reason, since it was the mayor of Sigües who bought Tiermas in 1982 with a grant given by the Diputación de Zaragoza, and that today receives large subsidies for its maintenance while the village is in absolute abandonment.

When the water level allows it, usually from September onwards, the ruins of the ancient Roman baths emerge from the bottom and again people can access the spring of sulfurous waters. In this season the old tradition of bathing in its waters which has been practiced since immemorial times is revived and there are many people who come to this spot to do so.

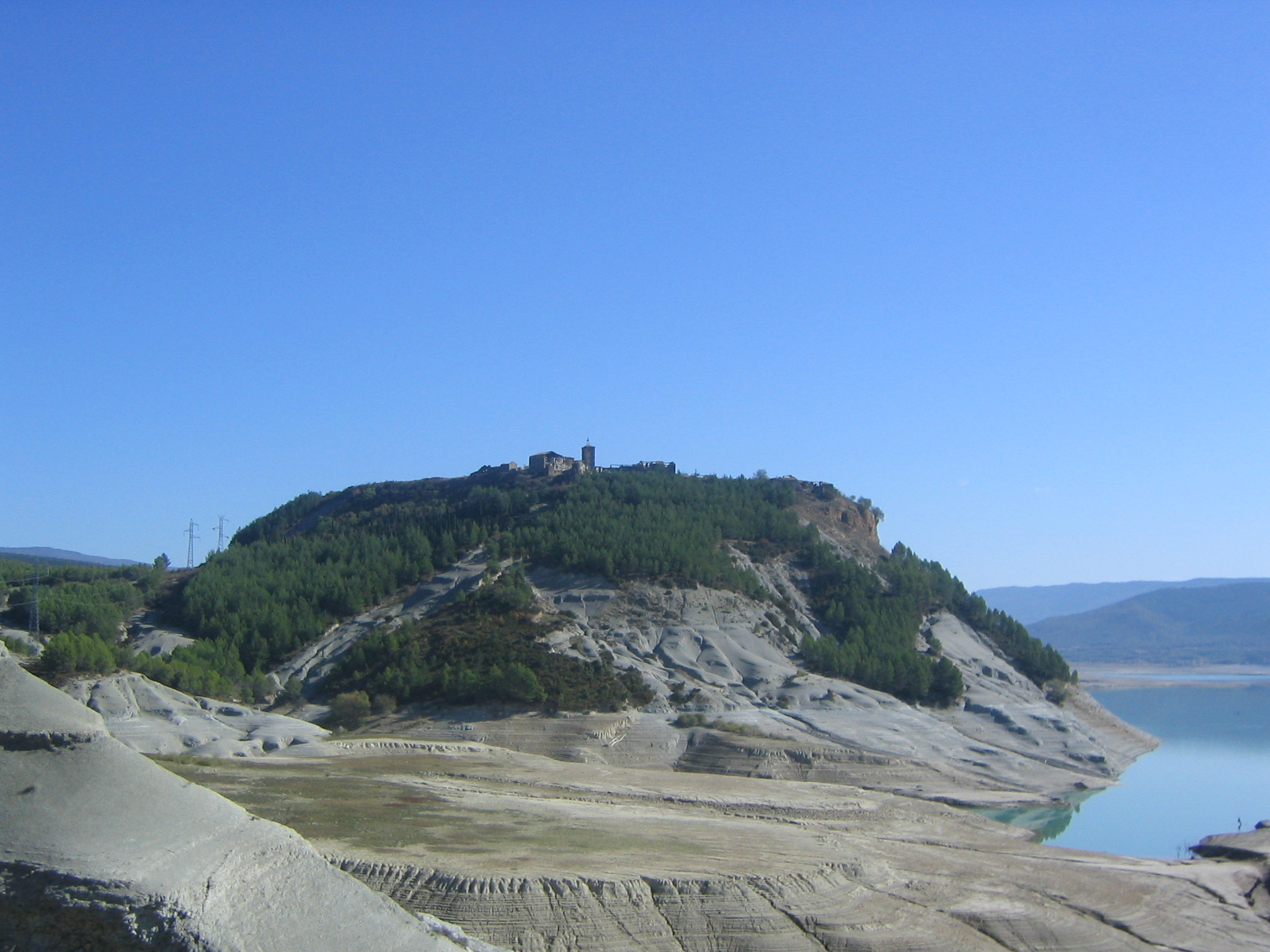
General view from the west.

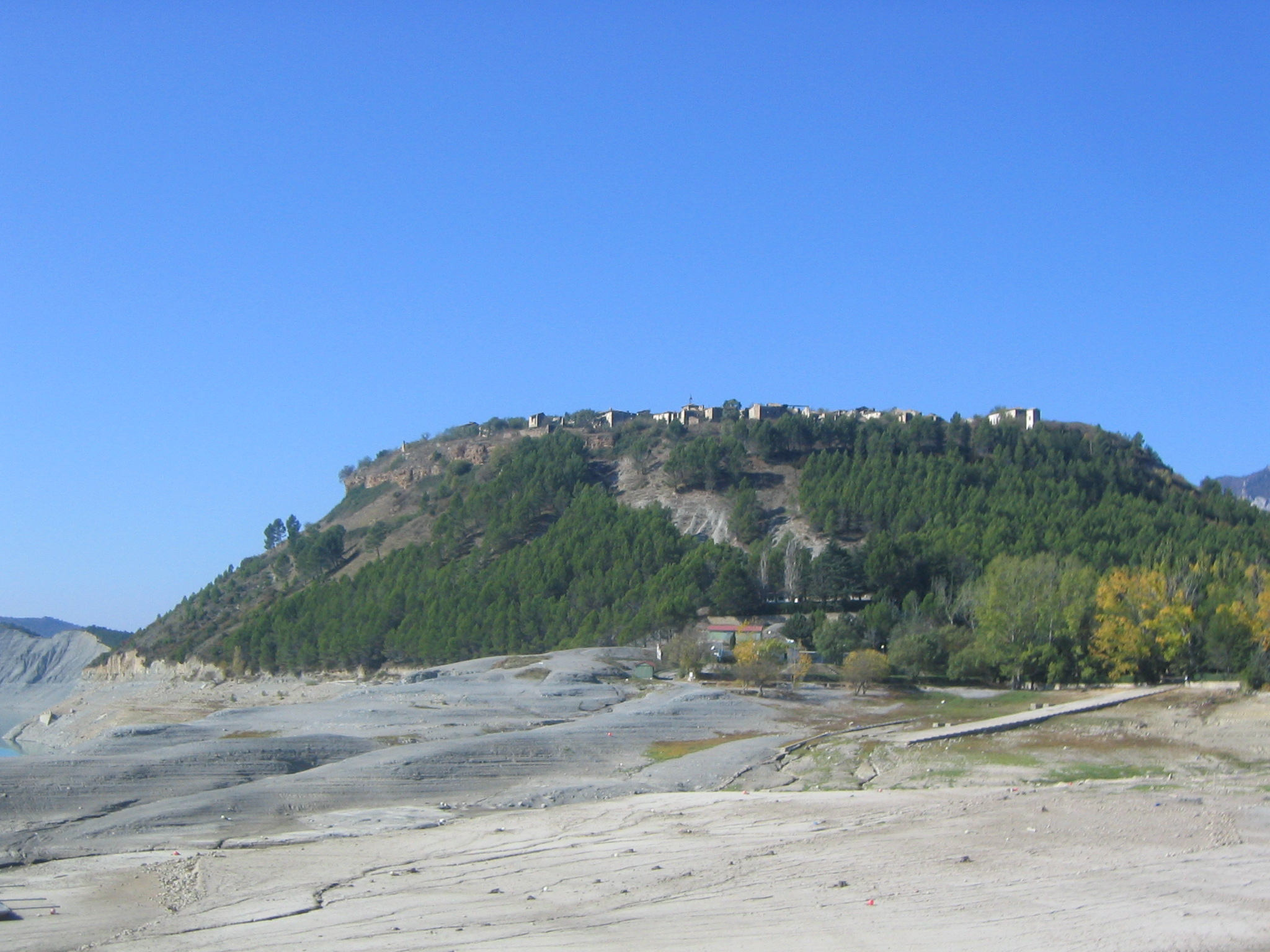
General view from the east.

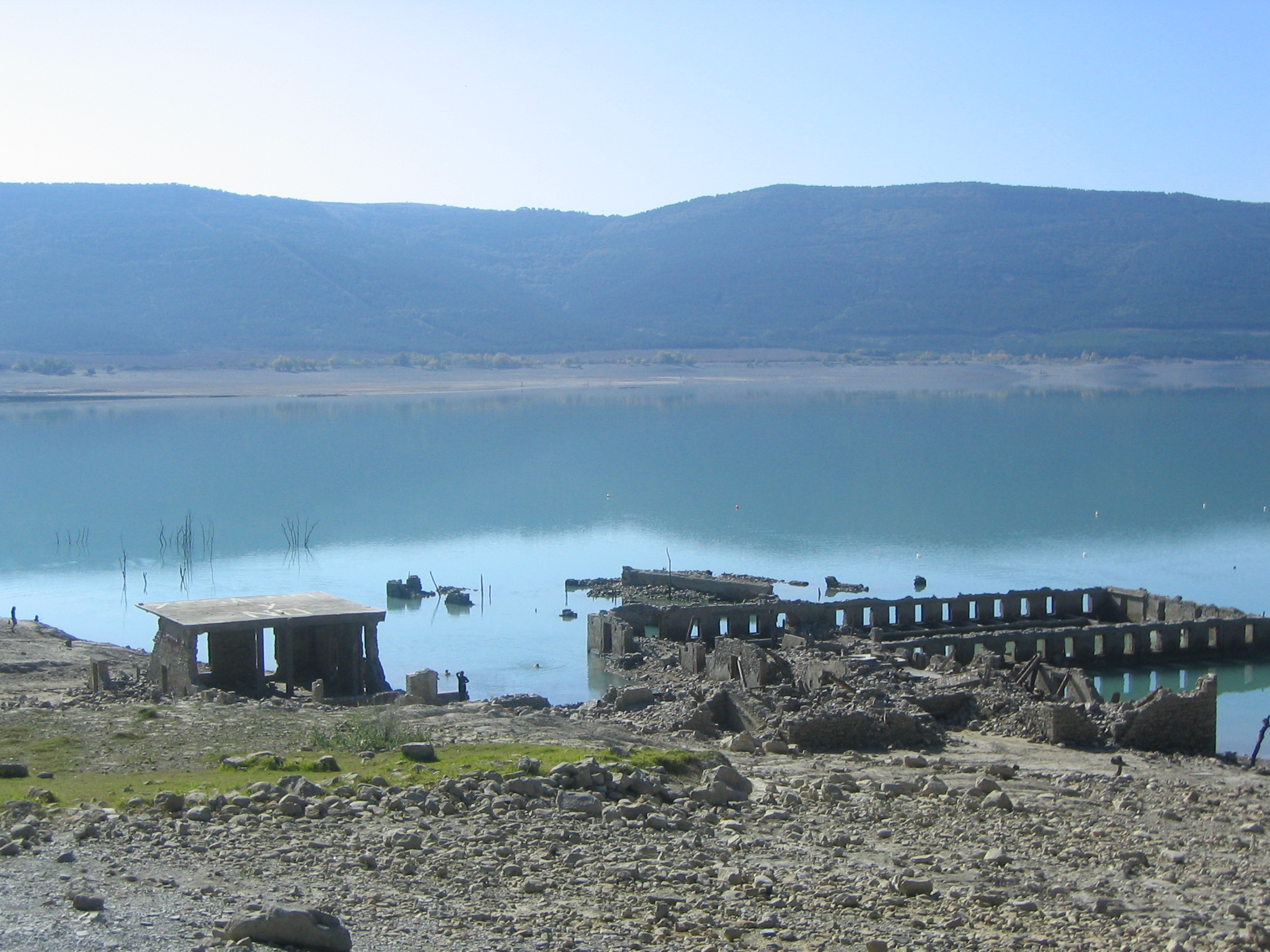
View of the area of the old spa.

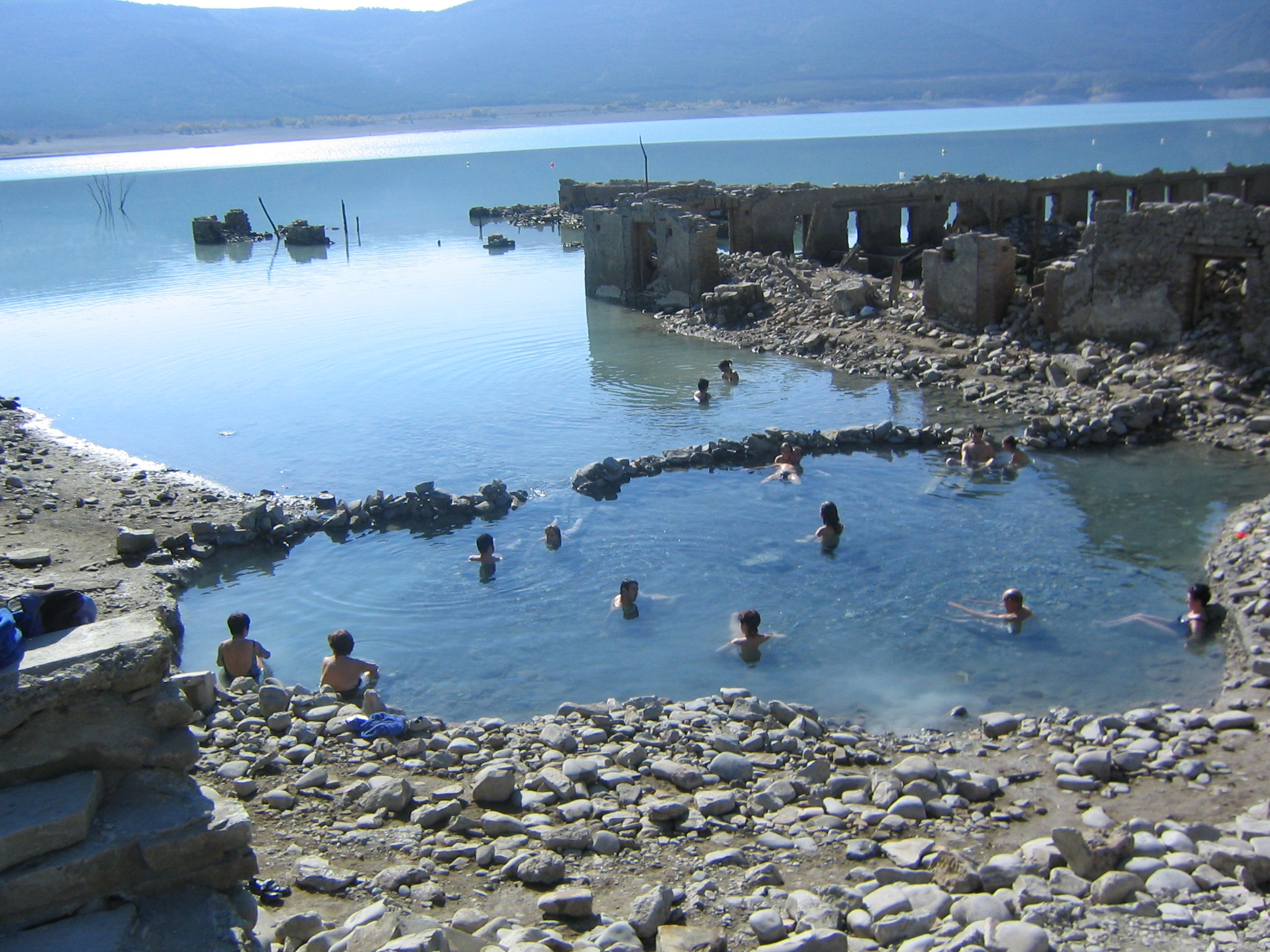
Spring of sulphurous waters.

== Heritage ==
- Torre de las Brujas
- St. Miguel Church

== See also ==
- El Bayo
- Yesa Reservoir
