= Cenarbe =

Abandoned village in the province of Huesca, Spain

Coordinates: 42°39′18″N 0°30′39″W

- Abandoned village
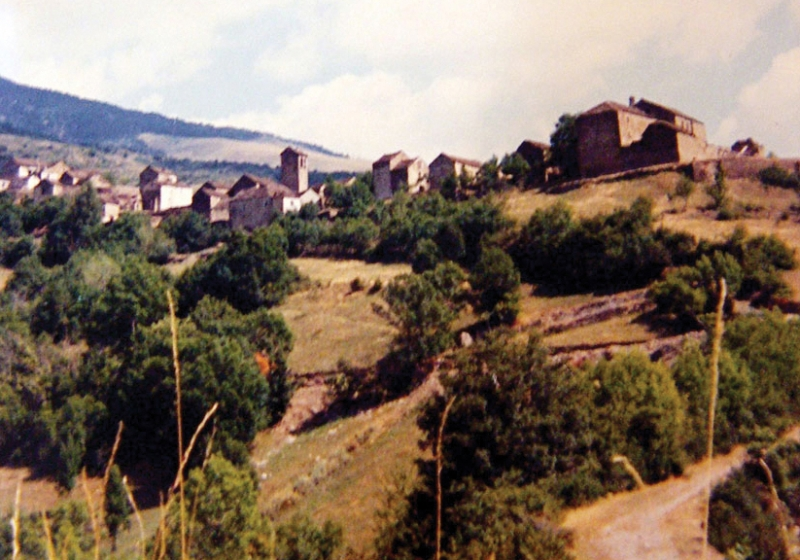
- View of Cenarbe before the expropriation, photo at the Villanúa Town Hall.

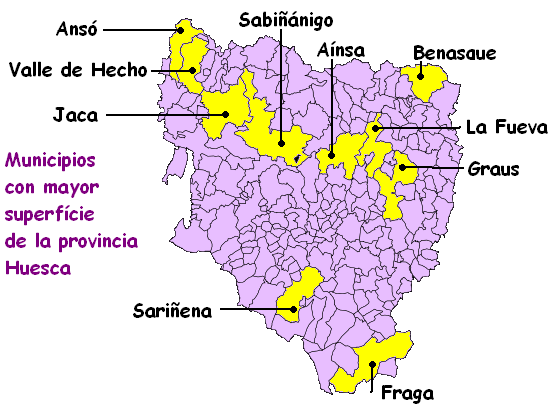
- Map of the province of Huesca
- Country: Spain
- Autonomous community: Aragon
- Province: Huesca
- Comarca: Jacetania
- Municipality: Villanúa
- Elevation: 1,200 m (3,900 ft)

Population
  - Total: 0

Cenarbe is an abandoned agricultural and livestock village. The locality belongs to the Spanish municipality of Villanúa (Huesca, Aragón). It was located at 1200 meters above sea level. Toponymic with origin in the old Basque Azenari-be, soil of foxes, the suffix -be (soil, lower part) would refer to the situation of the village in a small plain at the foot of Mount Vacún 2,114 meters high.

== History ==
Historically it was an independent municipality until, in 1849, it became part (like Aruej) of the Villanúa Town Council, in a process of administrative rationalization that included small villages in larger ones.

According to the Dictionary by Madoz, in 1858 it had 182 inhabitants and, apart from the 12th century church of San Pedro, this village also had a tower-house and, as an anecdote, it was noted for the presence of bears. Its inhabitants were nicknamed manzañones.

In November 1955, Forestry Heritage began, based on a 1927 Decree related to the construction of the Yesa Reservoir, the procedures for the voluntary purchase or subsequent expropriation of the land of Cenarbe and the Garcipollera Valley. All this in order to carry out a forced reforestation with laricio pine to stop the erosion of these valleys and the possible clogging of the reservoir basin, which caused the displacement of 400 people from the affected area. The sale/occupation/expropriation process culminated with decree 2899/1966 dated November 10, 1966 and published in the Official State Gazette of November 21, 1966, declaring the extinction of the local entity of Cenarbe belonging to the municipality of Villanúa, certifying its official disappearance.

Forestry Heritage created in this area a National Hunting Reserve where deer were introduced and, in 1995, the General Council of Aragon turned it into a Hunting Reserve.

Nowadays, only the ruined remains of the Romanesque church dedicated to San Pedro are still standing, since the rest of the houses were dynamited to avoid problems with the loose livestock that has foresters in the experimental center of Bescós de la Garcipollera and any possible later claim of the neighbors regarding their properties.
