= Ruesta =

Settlement in Zaragoza, Spain

- Abandoned village
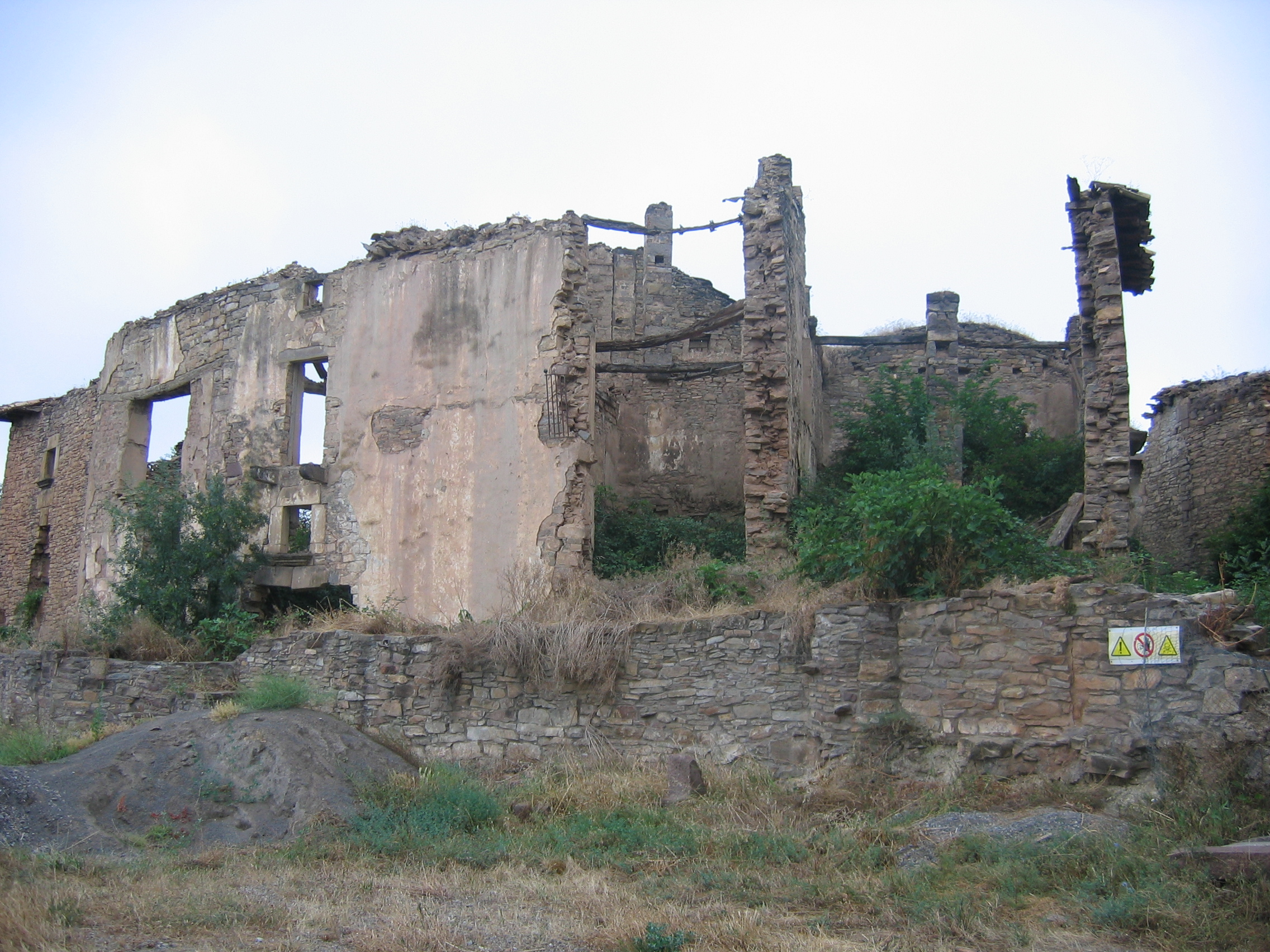
- Interactive map of Ruesta
- Coordinates: 42°35′21″N 1°04′35″W
- Country: Spain
- Autonomous community: Aragon
- Comarca: Cinco Villas
- Municipality: Sigüés and Urriés
- Province: Zaragoza

Population
  - Total: 0

Ruesta is a former settlement in the province of Zaragoza, in the autonomous community of Aragon (Spain), today belonging to the municipality of Urriés, in the region of Cinco Villas, judicial district of Ejea de los Caballeros.

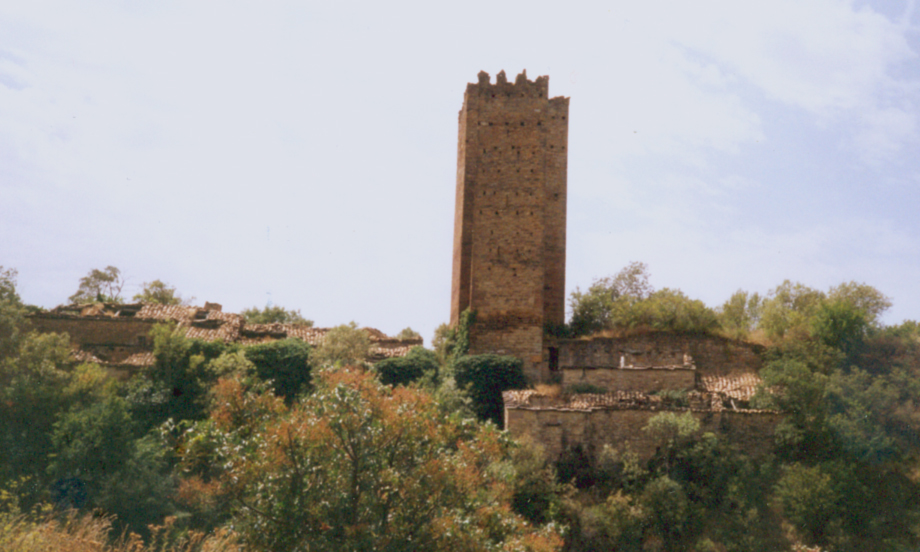
General view of the towers of the Fortress of Ruesta, the characteristic icon of Ruesta.

It is on the banks of the Aragón river and its tributary the Regal river as well as along the Barranco de Chesa, next to the Yesa reservoir, a swamp that floods part of its municipal area, which is also the cause of its current depopulation, since fields and houses were expropriated for its construction in the 1960s. Many of its neighbors left for the new repopulation nuclei in the irrigated areas of the Bardenas Canal such as Bardena, Santa Anastasia, Pinsoro and others; other neighbors left for other places. In Ruesta, since a few years ago, the old inhabitants and friends who wish to do so, meet in the town during the ¡Ruesta vive! festivities.

Part of its former municipal district passed into the hands of Sigüés, in the Jacetania region, although the territory of Ruesta remained in Urriés.

The Hydrographic Confederation of the Ebro legally ceded the use of Ruesta to the trade union Confederación General del Trabajo de Aragón, as part of a plan for the recovery of depopulated areas caused by reservoirs. The CGT, together with the Colegio Oficial de Arquitectos de Aragón, has carried out some reconstruction work on several buildings such as Casa Valentín and Casa Alfonso, which are now used as a hostel and cultural center for conferences, a library and a campsite.

The heritage recovery work carried out in May 2021 merited the Hispania Nostra Award for the rehabilitation project of the village and its section of the French Camino de Santiago in Aragon, coming from France by the via Arletanensis, reaches the city of Toulouse to cross the Pyrenean Mountains through the Somport pass. The rehabilitation of the Hermitage of Ruesta together with the one of Sigüés won the Ricardo Magdalena Trophy and has been executed by Sebastián Arquitectos and promoted by the Hydrographic Confederation of the Ebro.

Ruesta appears in the film La vaquilla by director Luis García Berlanga: the Republican camp was filmed in the village.

== Architectural heritage ==
- Ruesta castle, included in the list of castles considered Sites of Cultural Interest in the list was published in the Official Gazette of Aragon on May 22, 2006.
- Hermitage of Santiago
- Hermitage of San Juan Bautista

== Gallery of photos ==
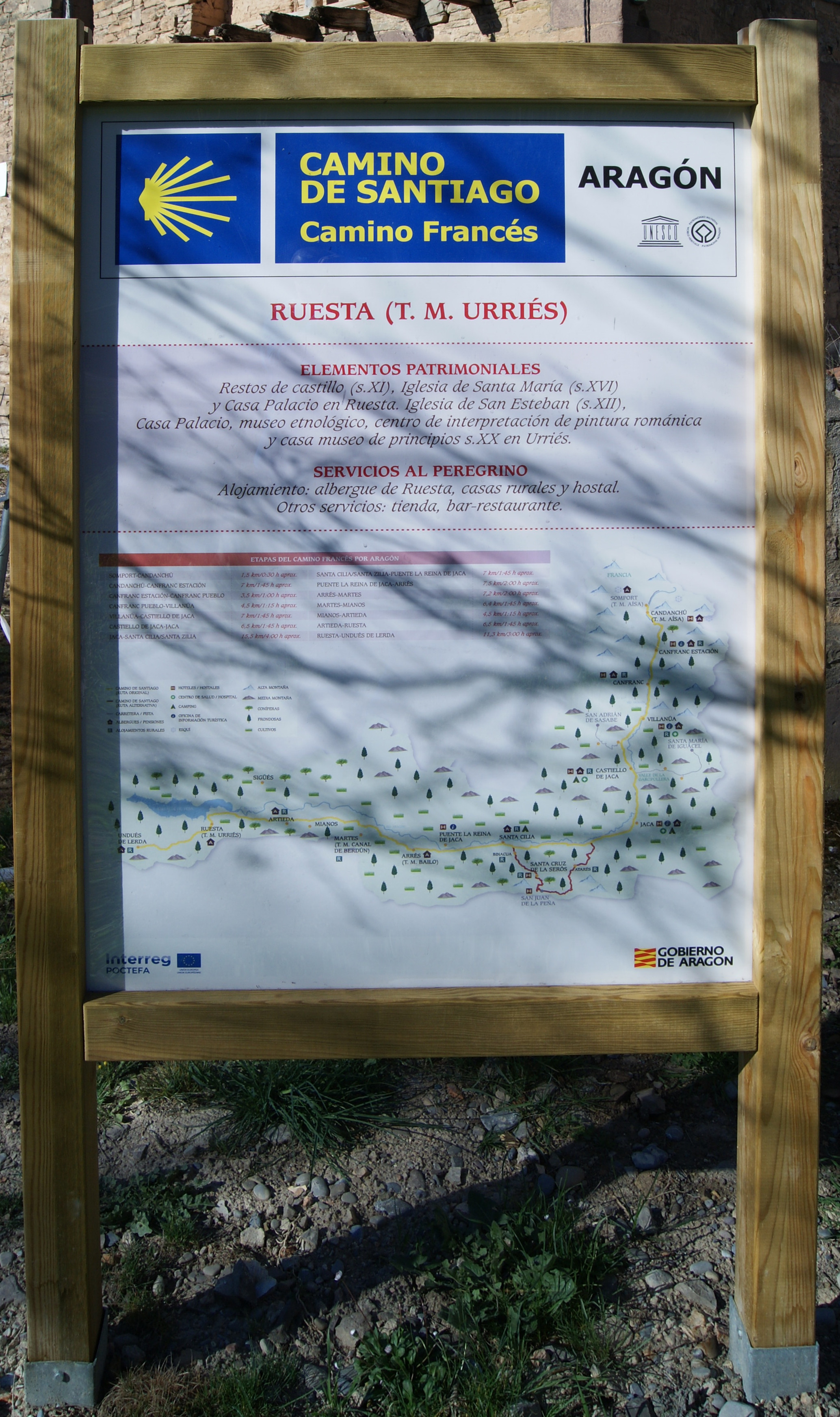
Camino de Santiago

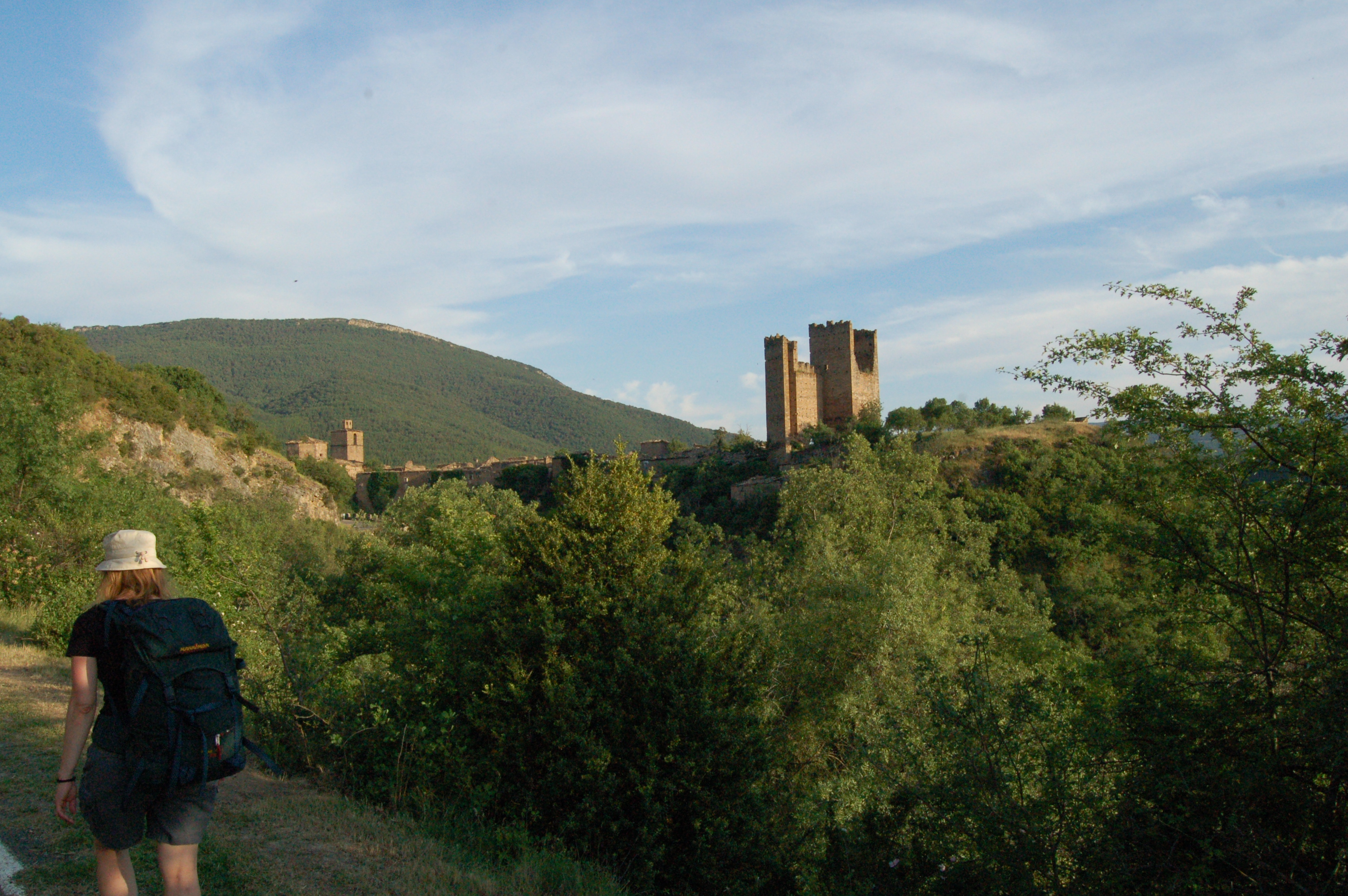
French camino de Santiago in Aragon, passing through Ruesta.

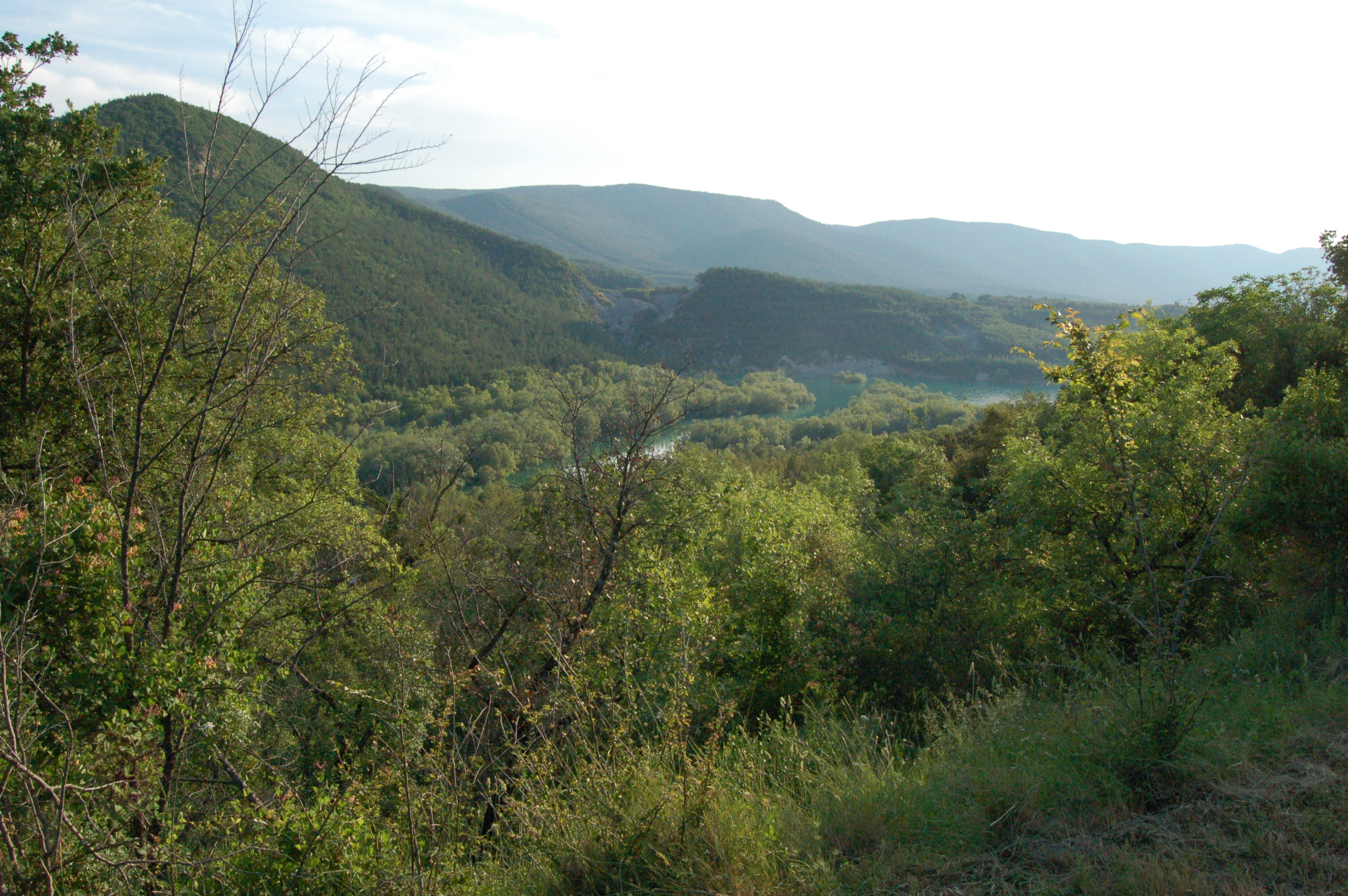
Surroundings of Ruesta

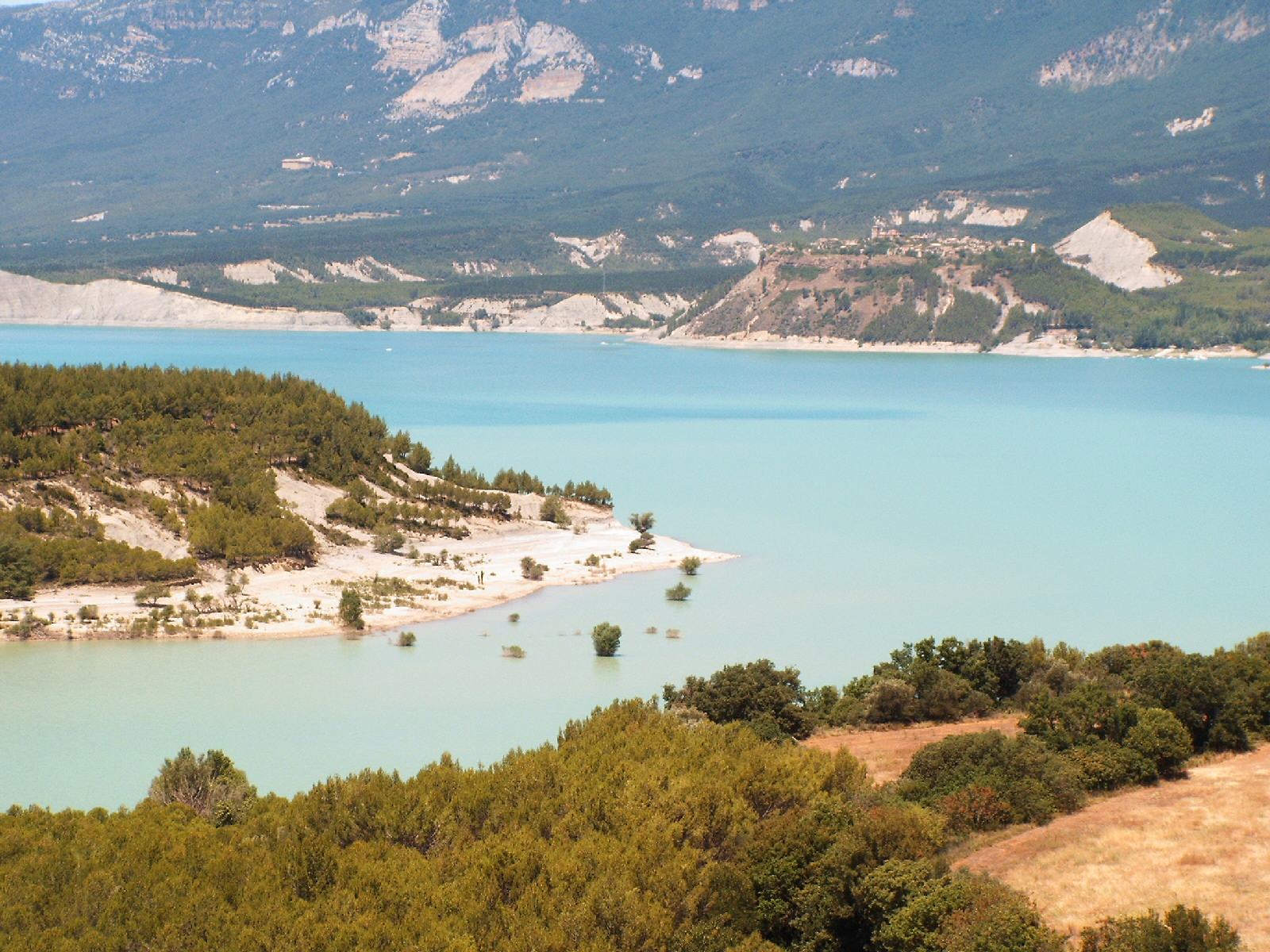
View of the Yesa Reservoir from Ruesta

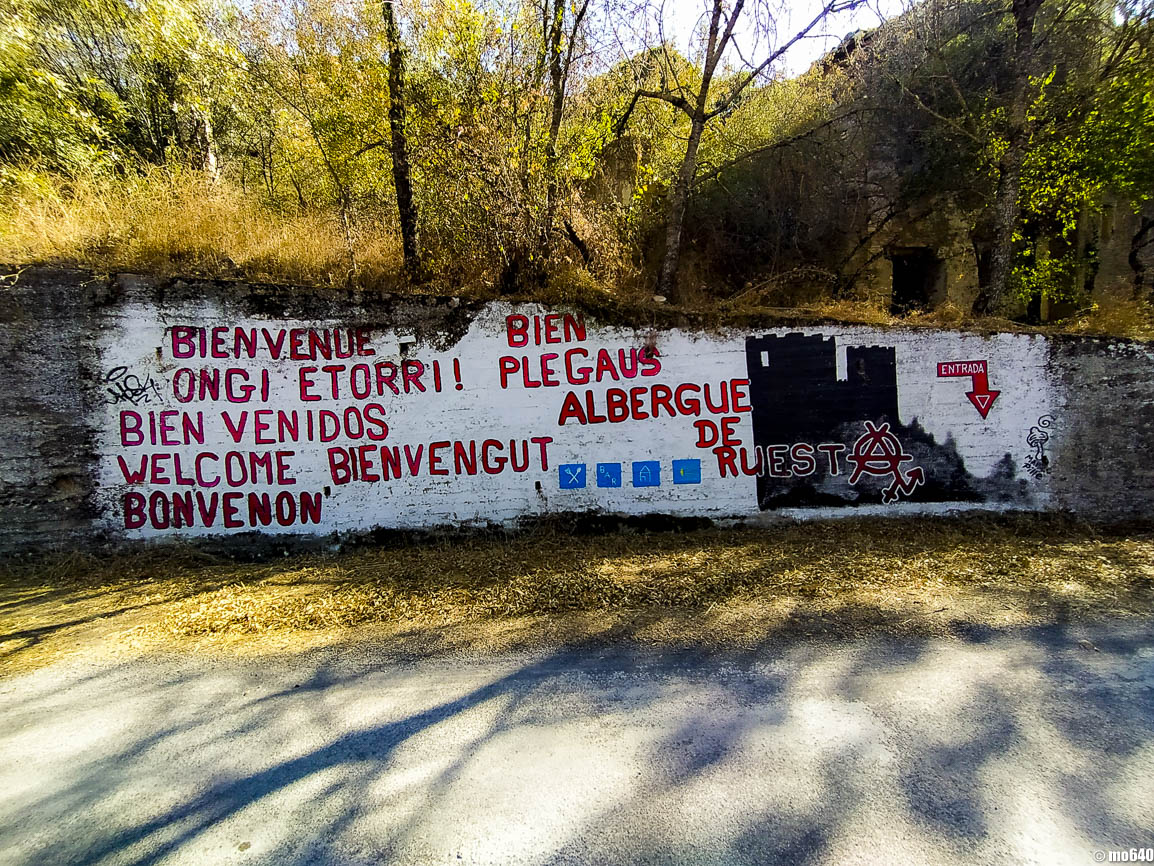
Welcome of the hostel

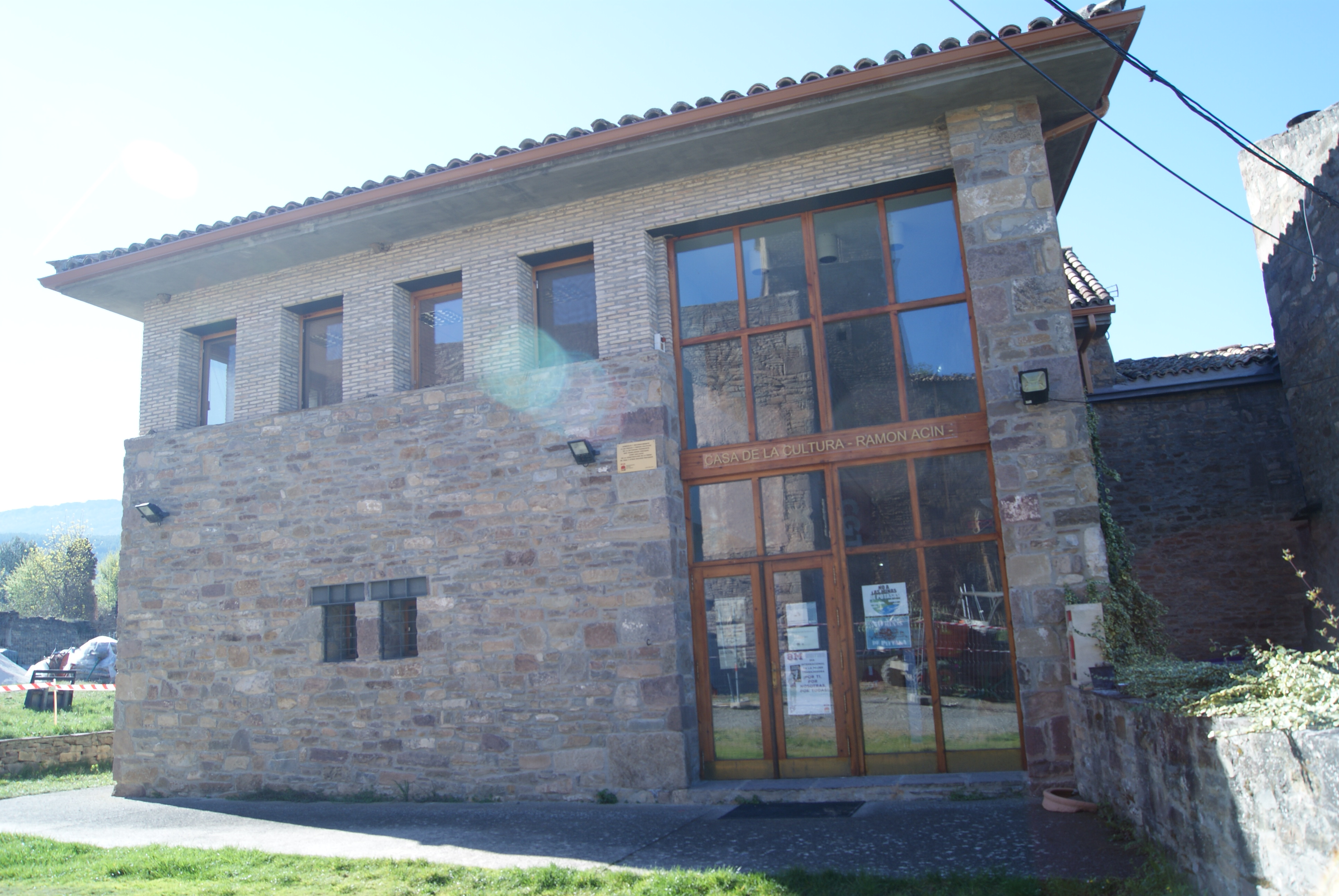
Cultural house Ramón Acín

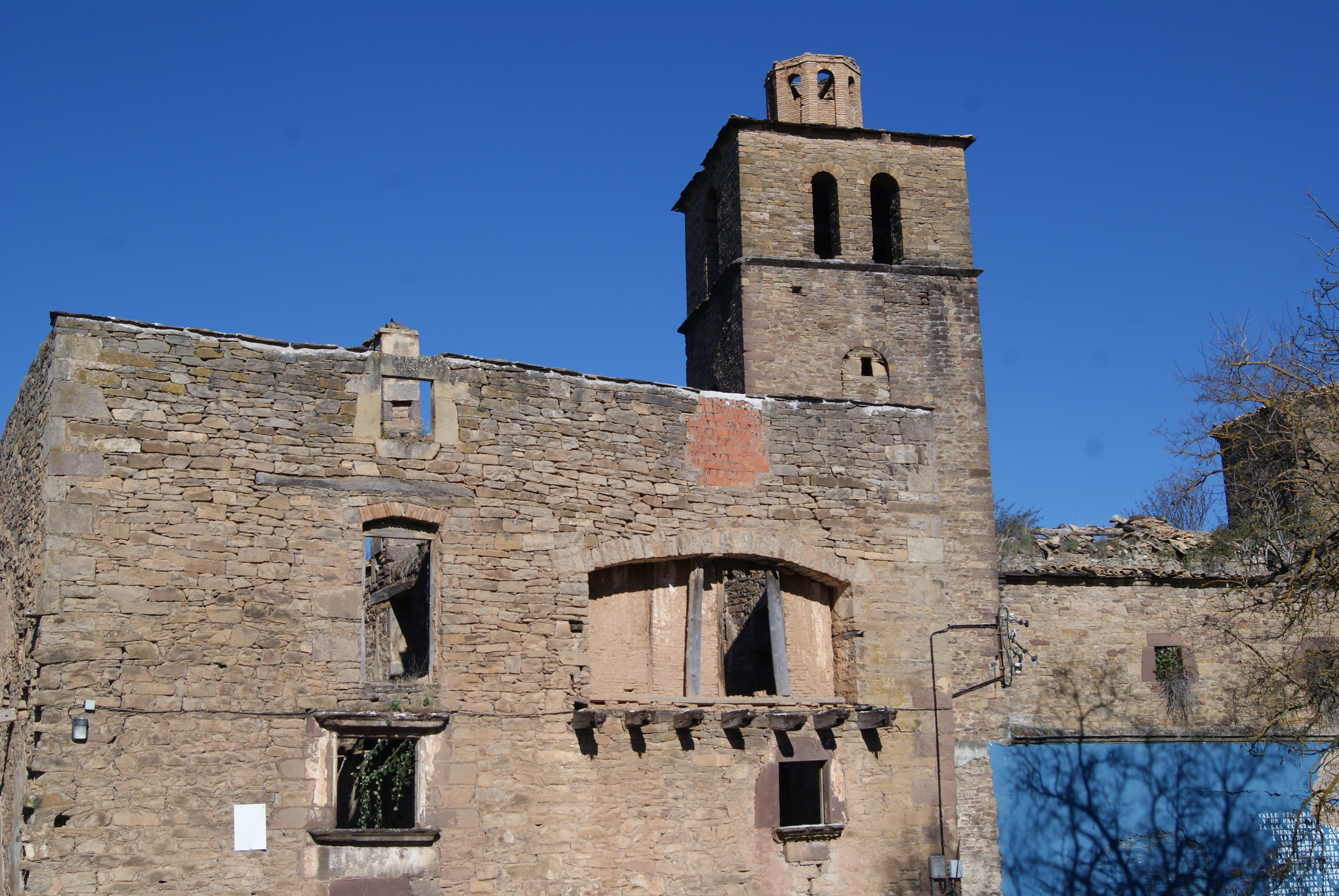
Church of Ruesta

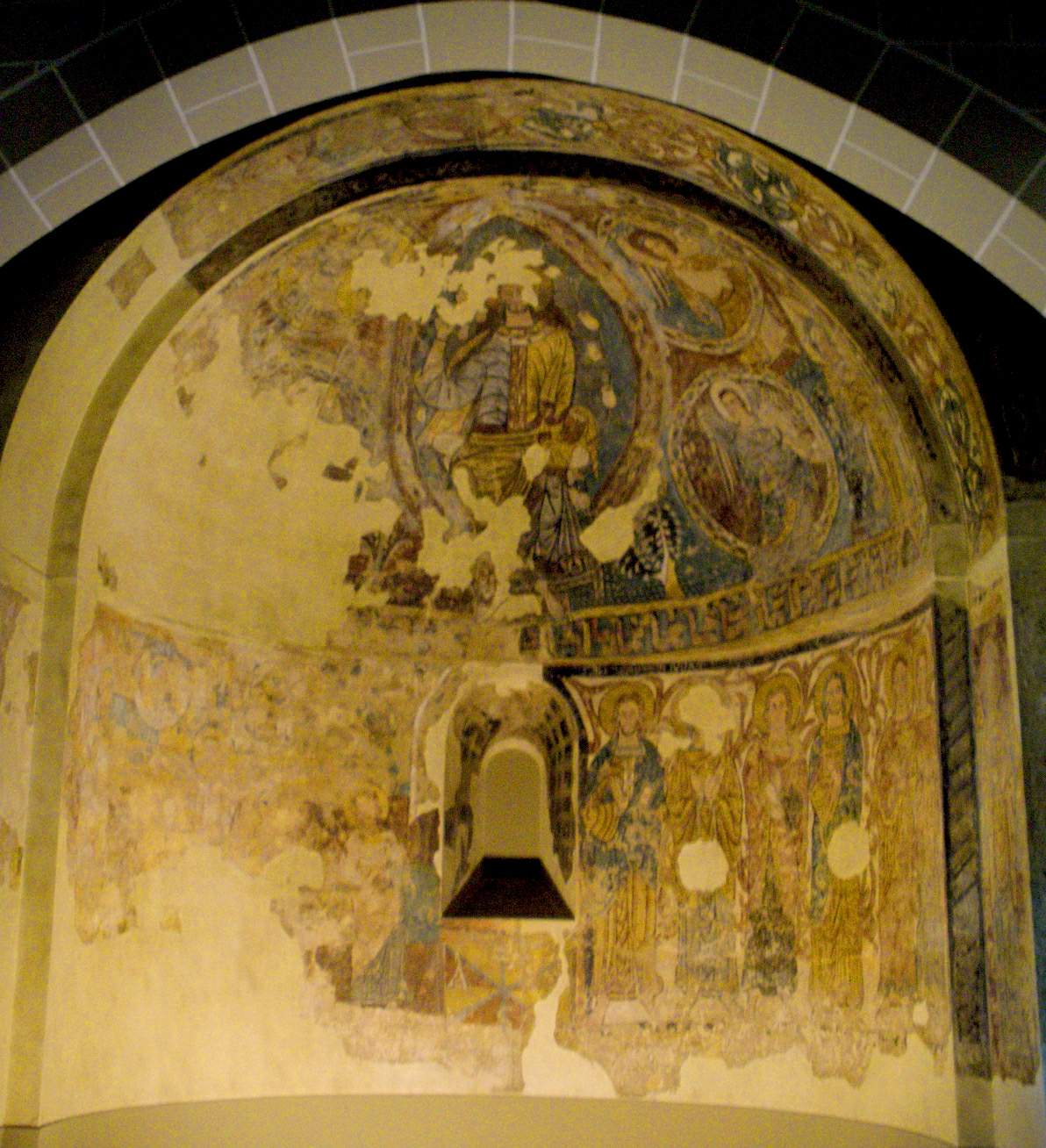
Murals of the Hermitage of St. Juan Bautista de Ruesta now in the Diocesan Museum of Jaca.

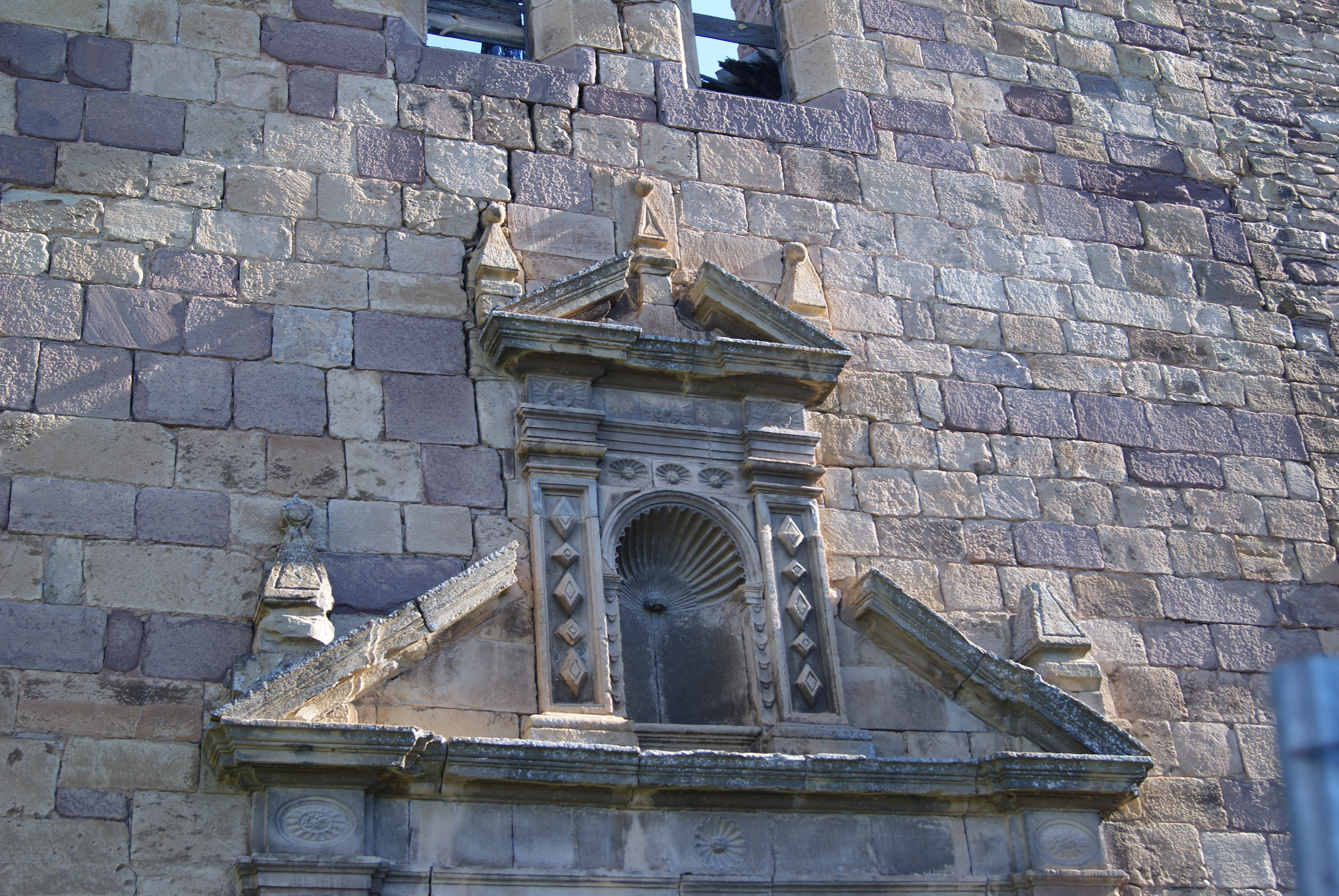
Church façade

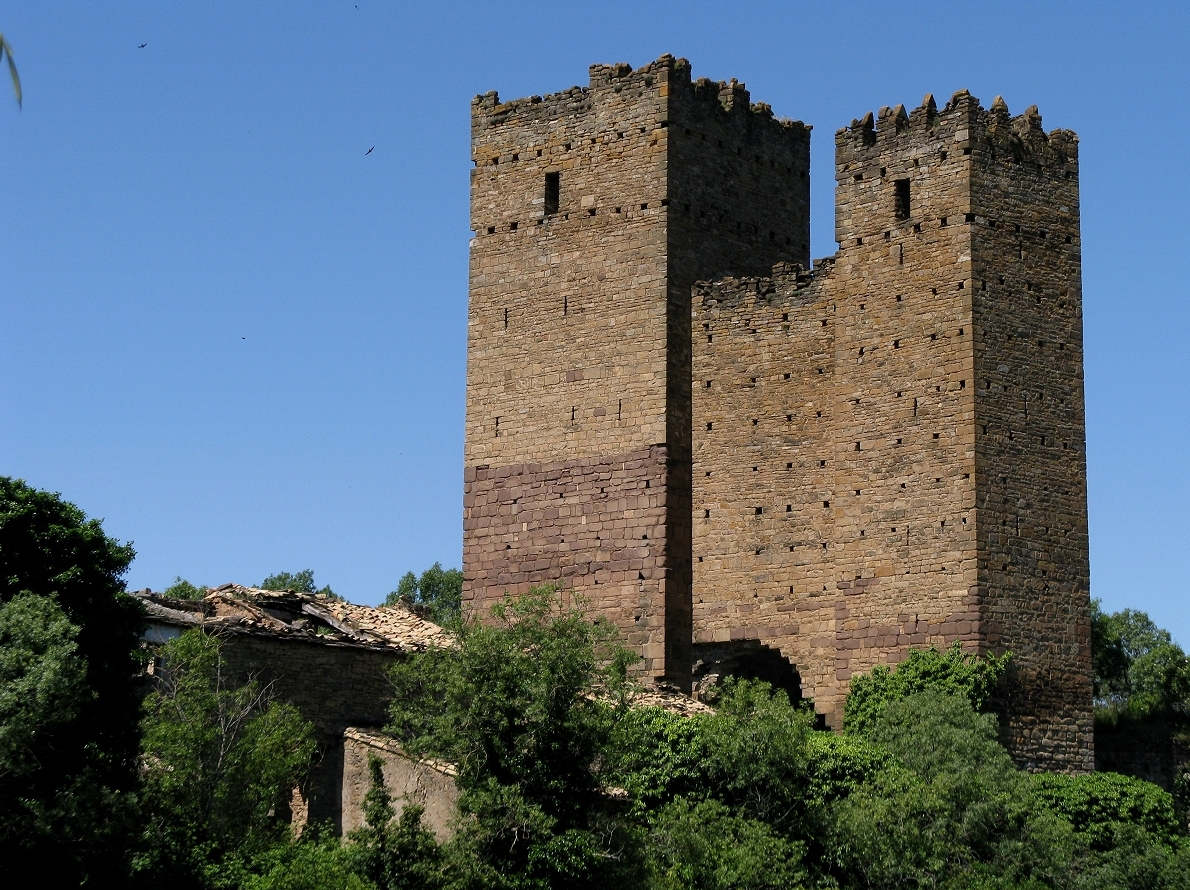
Towers

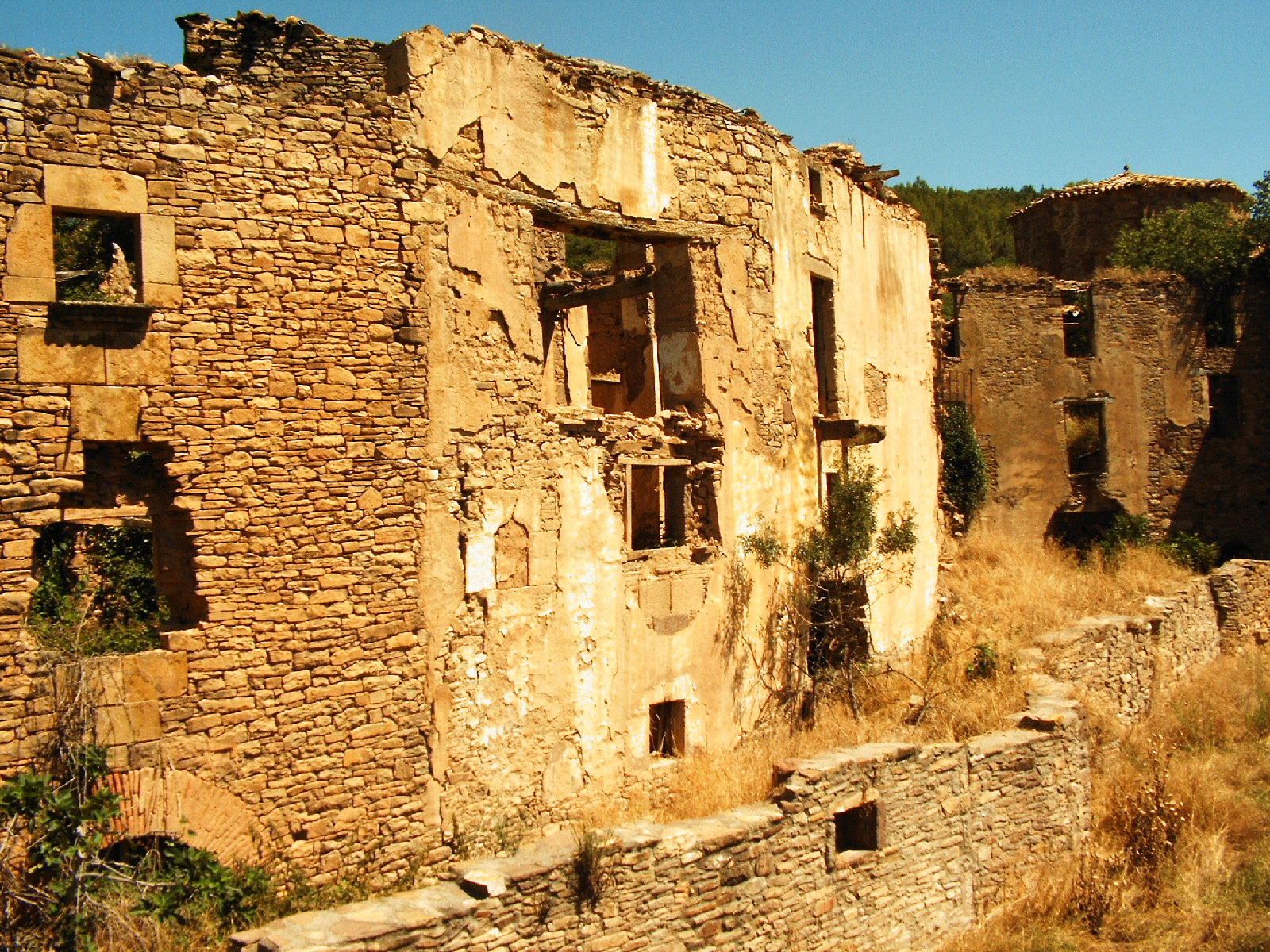
House in ruins
