= Villanúa =

Coordinates: 42°41′N 0°32′W

Villanúa Bellanuga (in Aragonese)
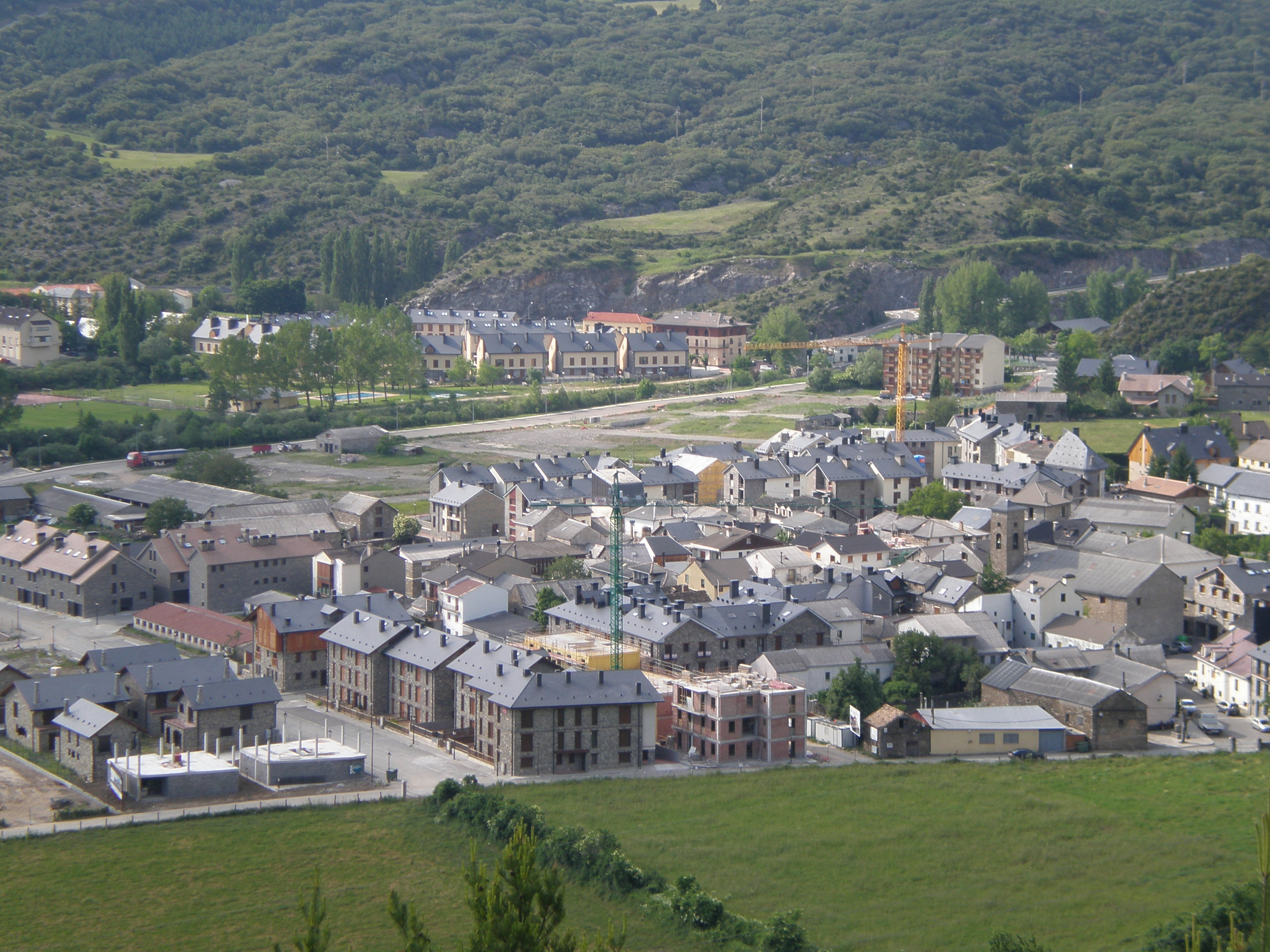
- View of Villanúa

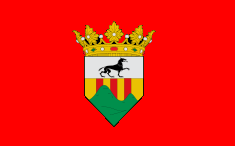
- Flag Coat of arms

- Location within Spain
- Country: Spain Spain
- Autonomous community: Aragon
- Province: Huesca
- Comarca: Jacetania
- Elevation: 953 m (3,127 ft)

Population (2018)
  - Total: 447
- Time zone: UTC+1 (CET)
  - Summer (DST): UTC+2 (CEST)
- Website: www.villanua.net

Villanúa (in Aragonese: Bellanuga) is a Pyrenean municipality in Spain in the north of Huesca province, in la Jacetania, set where the Aragon valley gets wider. Its name refers to the "new village" repopulated in the late 10th century. Villanúa's altitude is 953 m and it covers 58.2 km^{2}. The village is at the bottom of mount Collarada (2886 m) and in 2018 had 447 inhabitants.

It is a tourist locality located between Jaca and the ski stations of Candanchú and Astún and near the French border (12 km. by the Tunnel of Somport).

Population between 1900 and 2014
1900	1910	1920	1930	1940	1950	1960	1970	1981	1991	2001	2011	2018
959	1.114	847	682	585	551	446	323	265	283	340	512	447

== Visiting ==
The old centre, the church of San Esteban (with a wooden 11th-century Romanesque image of the Virgin, "Our Lady of the Angels"), the cave of Las Güixas, the railway viaduct, dolmens, the Chapel of San Juan and the abandoned villages of Cenarbe and Aruej, with its little Romanesque church of San Vicente (12th century), all in an environment crossed by the Aragon river. It lies on the old Aragonese pilgrim's road to Santiago de Compostela, the Way of St James.

The main festivities are September 8 (Virgin's Nativity) and December 26 (San Esteban).

== See also ==
- List of municipalities in Huesca

Preceded by Canfranc	The Aragonese Way of the Way of St. James	Succeeded by Castiello de Jaca
