= Urriés =

Coordinates: 42°32′N 1°07′W

Urriés, Spain
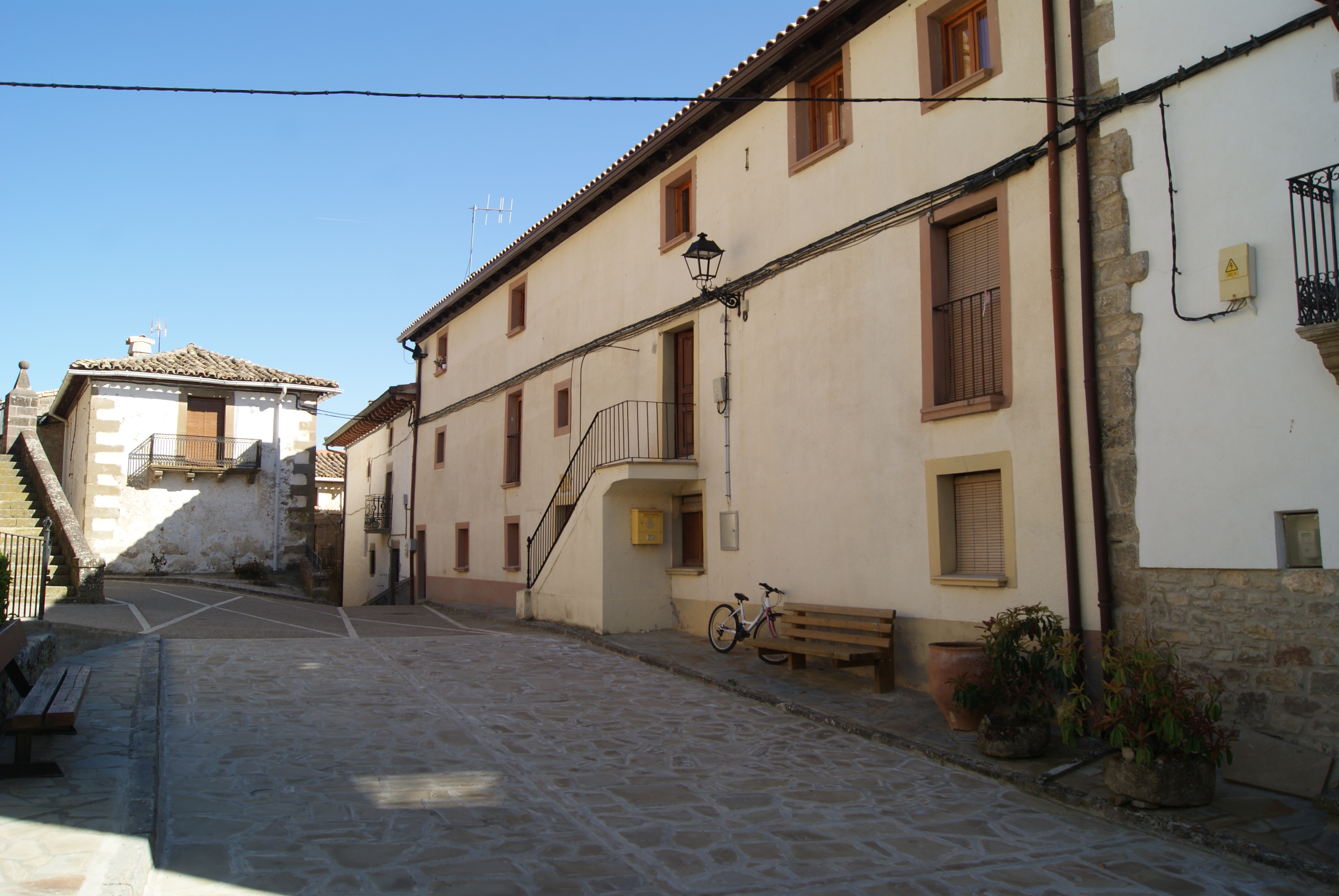
- Town hall

- Flag Coat of arms
- Interactive map of Urriés, Spain
- Country: Spain
- Autonomous community: Aragon
- Province: Zaragoza
- Municipality: Urriés

Area
  - Total: 37 km^{2} (14 sq mi)

Population (2025-01-01)
  - Total: 50
  - Density: 1.4/km^{2} (3.5/sq mi)
- Time zone: UTC+1 (CET)
  - Summer (DST): UTC+2 (CEST)

Urriés is a municipality located in the province of Zaragoza, Aragon, Spain. According to the 2004 census (INE), the municipality had a population of 59 inhabitants.

== See also ==
- List of municipalities in Zaragoza
