= Sigüés =

Sigüés, Spain
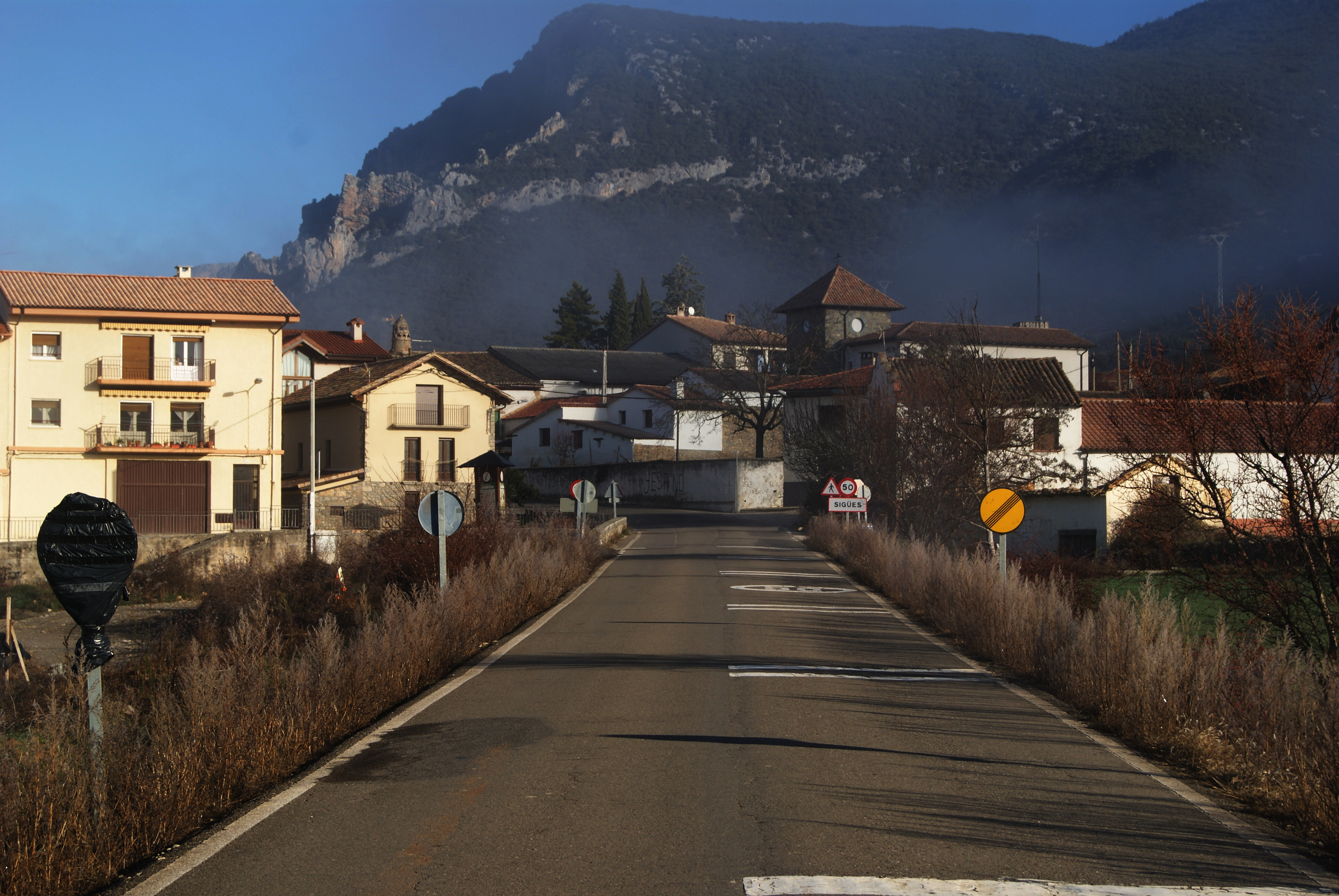
- Street of Sigüés

- Flag Coat of arms
- Interactive map of Sigüés, Spain
- Coordinates: 42°37′49″N 1°00′43″W
- Country: Spain
- Autonomous community: Aragon
- Province: Zaragoza
- Municipality: Sigüés

Area
  - Total: 101 km^{2} (39 sq mi)

Population (2025-01-01)
  - Total: 72
  - Density: 0.71/km^{2} (1.8/sq mi)
- Time zone: UTC+1 (CET)
  - Summer (DST): UTC+2 (CEST)

Sigüés is a municipality located in the province of Zaragoza, Aragon, Spain. According to the 2004 census (INE), the municipality has a population of 172 inhabitants.

== Villages ==
- Asso-Veral
- Escó
- Tiermas

== See also ==
- List of municipalities in Zaragoza
