= Yesa =

Settlement in Navarre, Spain

Coordinates: 42°37′10″N 1°12′11″W

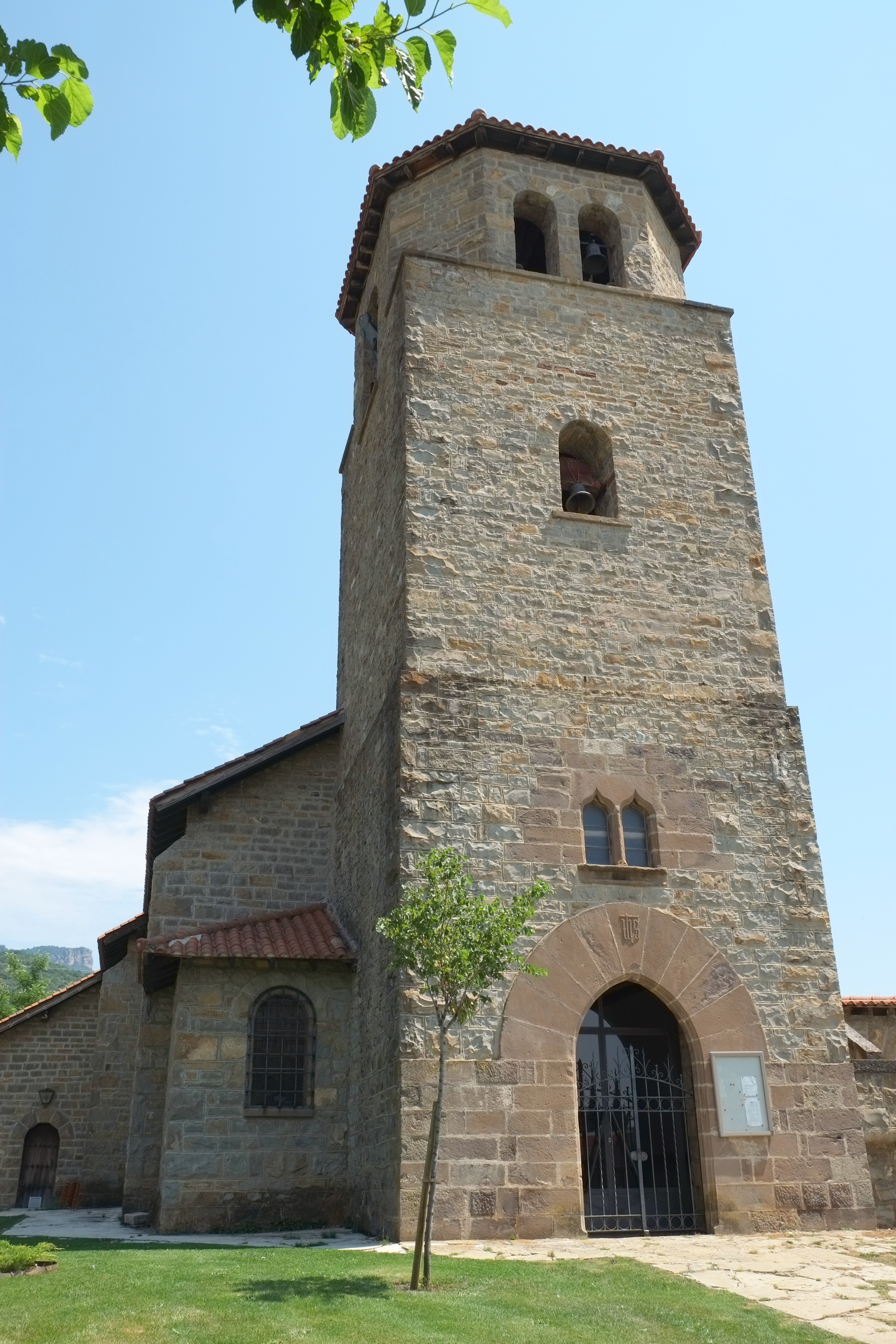
San Esteban Church in Yesa, Navarre, Spain

Yesa (Basque: Esa) is a town and municipality located in the province and autonomous community of Navarre, in Northern Spain.
