= Ebro Hydrographic Confederation =

Spanish river basin management group

Confederación Hidrográfica del Ebro (CHE)

Hydrographic demarcation

Location
Country	Spain
Autonomous communities	Cantabria Castile and León La Rioja Basque country Navarre Aragon Catalonia

Characteristics
Area	85 362 km^{2}
Rivers	347
Population	3 019 176 habitantes

Management body
Name	Confederación Hidrográfica del Ebro (CHE)
President	María Dolores Pascual Vallés
Headquarter	Paseo de Sagasta, 24–26, Zaragoza

Hydrographic confederations of Spain

The Ebro Hydrographic Confederation (in Spanish: Confederación Hidrográfica del Ebro, CHE) is the organization that manages, regulates and maintains the water and irrigation of the Ebro hydrographic basin (northeastern Spain). The organization's headquarters are in Zaragoza and it was the first institution created in the world with the objective of managing an entire river basin in a unitary manner.

== History ==
Map of the Ebro valley

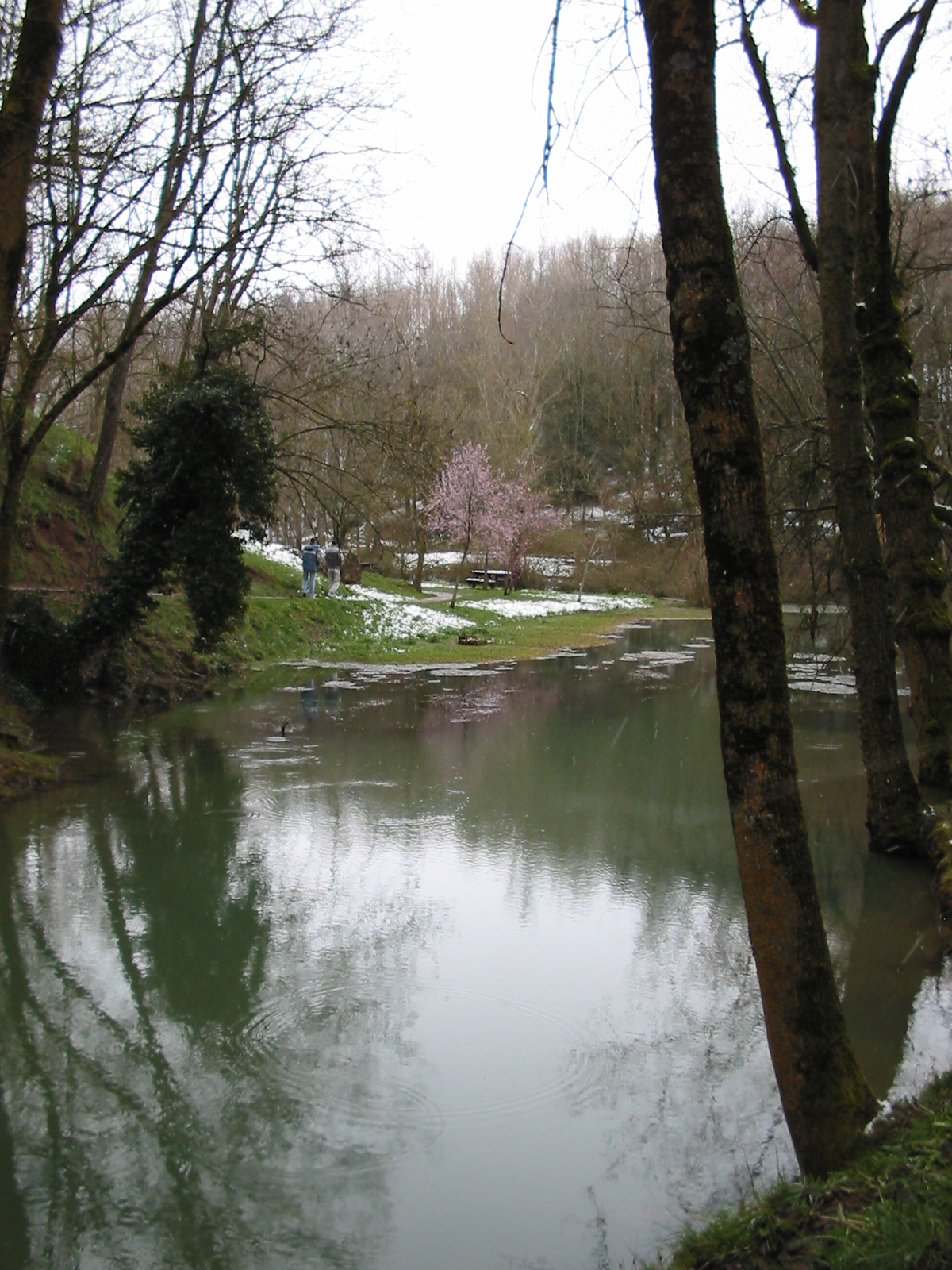
Source of the Ebro in Fontibre

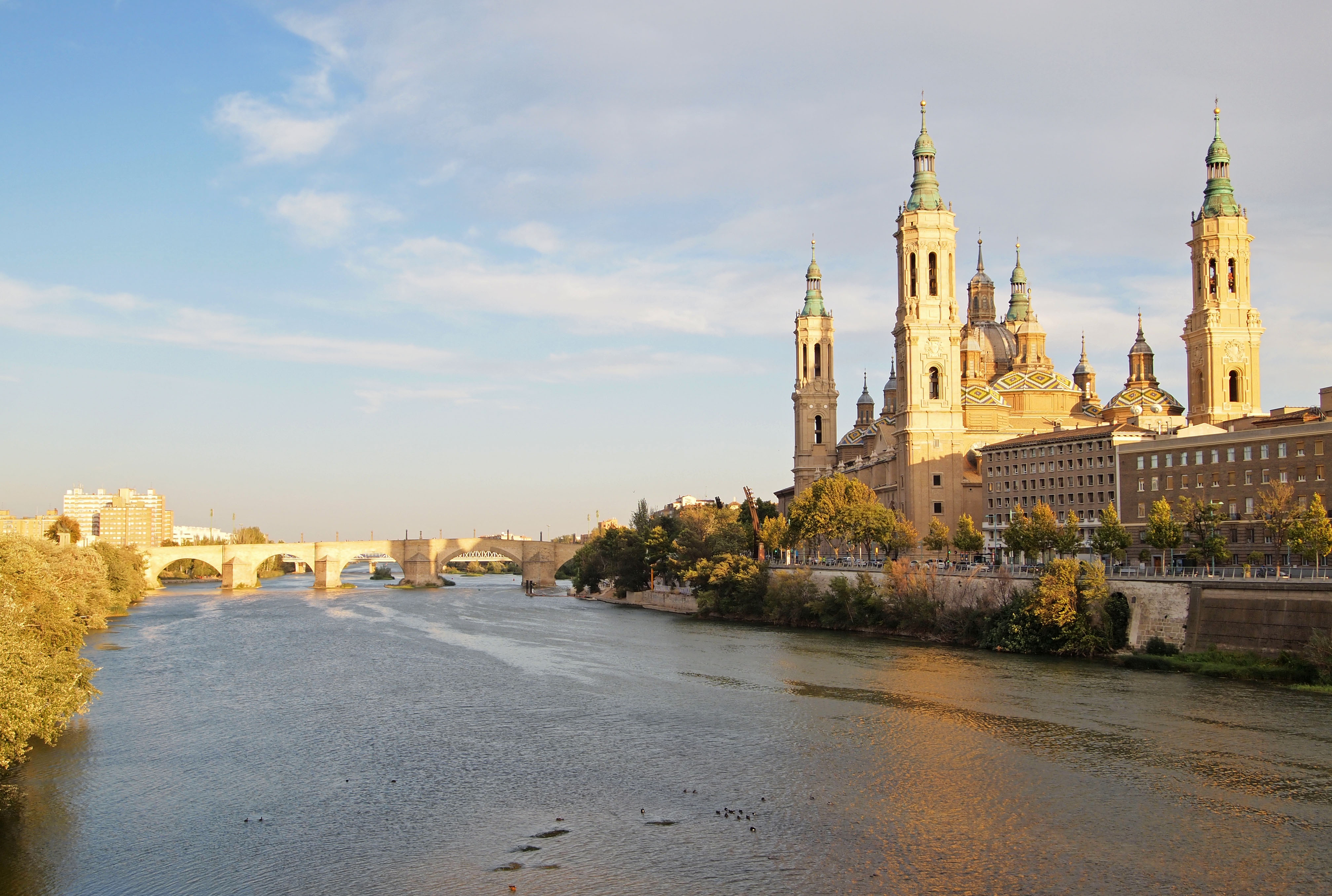
The middle Ebro in Zaragoza

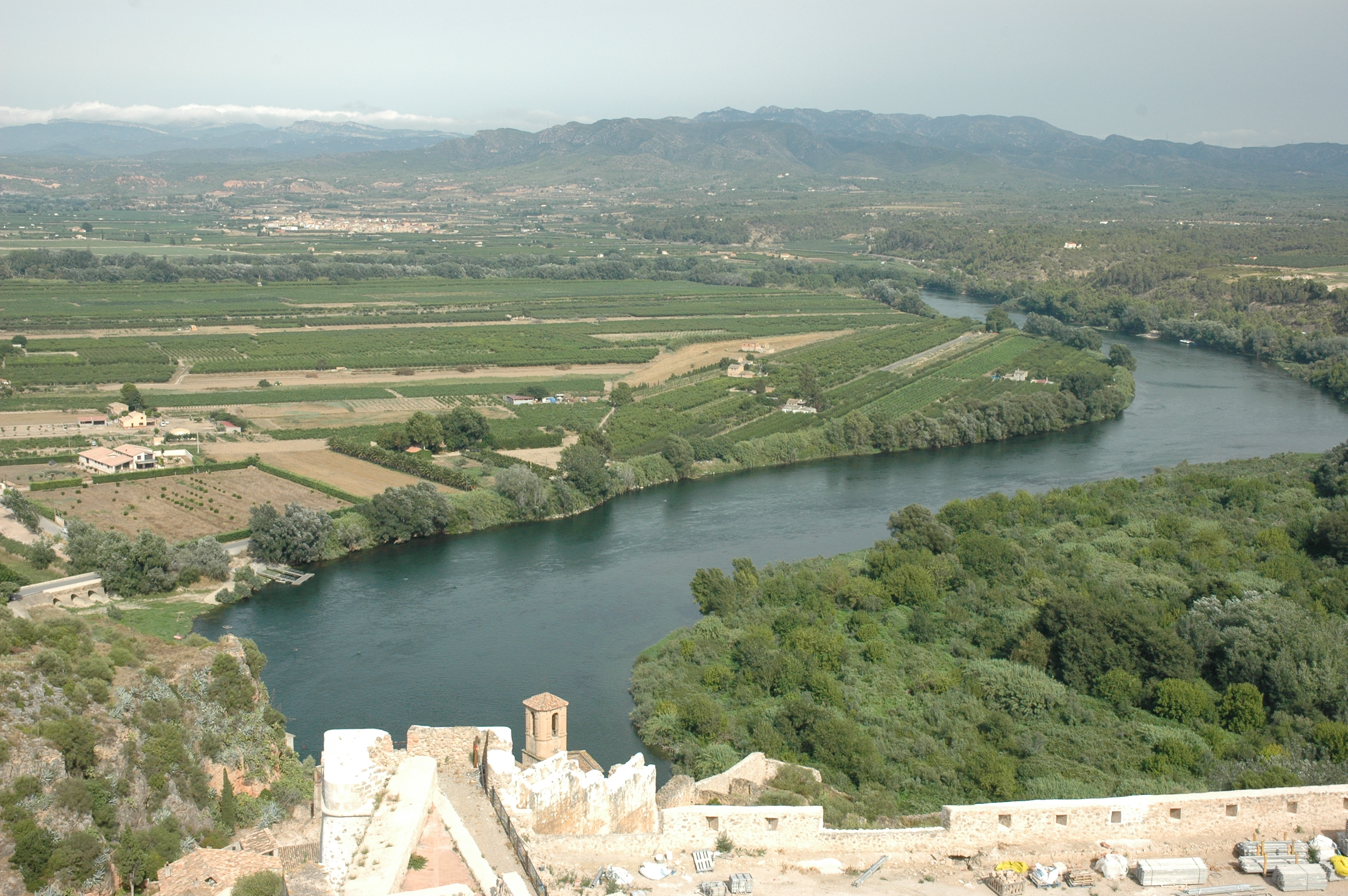
Final section, in Miravet

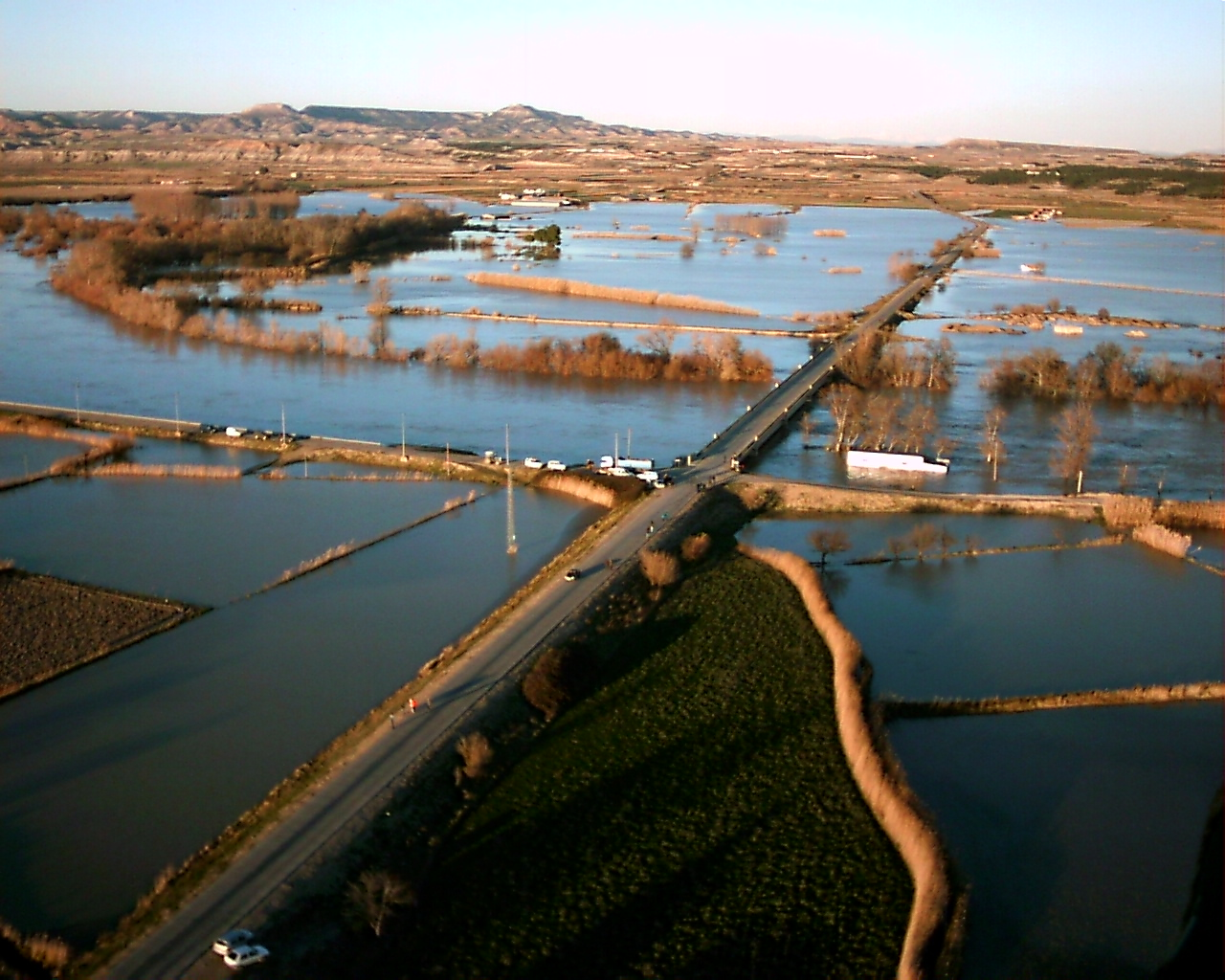
Floods of 2003, in Novillas (Zaragoza)

In 1913, the First National Irrigation Congress was held in Zaragoza, exposing the idea of setting up a community group of an economic and supra-regional nature through the federation of the agricultural, commercial and industrial associations of the whole area subject to the influence of the Ebro.

In 1926, during the dictatorship of Primo de Rivera, the Confederaciones Hidrográficas were created under the name of Confederaciones Sindicales Hidrográficas. Article 1 of the founding Royal Decree states that:

In all the hydrographic basins in which the Administration declares it convenient or in which at least 70% of its agricultural and industrial wealth, affected by the use of its flowing waters, requests it, the Confederación Sindical Hidrográfica will be formed.

The Confederación Sindical Hidrográfica del Ebro was the first to be set up, by Royal Decree of March 5, 1926, and its first Technical Director was the engineer Manuel Lorenzo Pardo, a follower of the ideas of Joaquín Costa, the great instigator of its founding.

In 1931, the government of the Republic restructured the Ebro Hydrographic Confederation, renaming it the Mancomunidad Hidrográfica del Ebro (Ebro Hydrographic Commonwealth). Manuel Lorenzo Pardo was dismissed and replaced by Félix de los Ríos. In March 1936 he was replaced by Nicolás Liria Almor. In 1932 the Mancomunidad Hidrográfica del Ebro was renamed as Delegación de Servicios Hidráulicos del Ebro and in 1934 it was again renamed Confederación Hidrográfica del Ebro.

== General information ==
The CHE is an autonomous agency under the Ministry of Ecological Transition. The functions of this agency are regulated in Article 25 of Royal Decree 927/1988, which approves the Regulations of the Public Administration of Water and Hydrological Planning.

These functions are the following:

- The preparation of the basin hydrological plan, as well as its monitoring and revision.
- The administration and control of the hydraulic public domain.
- The administration and control of uses of general interest or affecting more than one Autonomous Community.
- The project, construction and operation of the works carried out with charge to the own funds of the Agency, and those that are entrusted to them by the State.
- Those deriving from agreements with Autonomous Communities, local corporations and other public or private entities, or from those signed with individuals.

The Ebro Confederation is also responsible for economic and ecological problems, such as zebra mussels and other introduced animal and plant species, and for providing users with information on the measures that can be taken in the use of boats, contained in the navigation regulations. It is an autonomous body under the Ministry of the Environment. The functions of this agency are regulated in article 25 of Royal Decree 927/1988, which approves the Regulations of the Public Administration of Water and Hydrological Planning.

== Scope ==
The Ebro river basin is located in the NE quadrant of the Iberian Peninsula and covers a total surface area of 85,362 km^{2}, of which 445 km^{2} are in Andorra, 502 km^{2} in France and the rest in Spain. It is the largest river basin in Spain, representing 17.3% of the Spanish peninsular territory. Its natural limits are: to the north the Cantabrian Mountains and the Pyrenees, to the southeast the Iberian System and to the east the Coastal-Catalan chain.

It is drained by the Ebro river which, with a total length of 910 km, runs NW-SE, from the Cantabrian Mountains to the Mediterranean, where it flows into a magnificent delta. On its way it collects water from the Pyrenees and Cantabrian mountains on its left bank through important tributaries, such as the Aragón, Gállego, Segre, etc. and on its right bank it receives tributaries from the Sistema Ibérico, normally less abundant, such as the Oja, Iregua, Jalón or Guadalope. The scope of action is very complex, affecting numerous communities and even interacting with administrations of countries such as France or Andorra. For example, the Segre river, one of the main tributaries, rises in the French Alta Cerdanya, crosses mountainous areas with numerous lagoons and springs and in turn receives tributaries such as the Valltoba, the Llosa river, the Quer, the Noguera Pallaresa, the Noguera Ribagorzana and the Cinca. Even at the local level, as shown by the helophytic vegetation that surrounds them, the saline streams and lagoons are sometimes remarkable. In total, there are about 12,000 km of main river network.

- Surface area: 85 362 km^{2}.
- Main rivers: 347
- Length of rivers: 12 000 km
- Inhabitants of the basin according to 2005 census: 3 019 176
- Length of rivers: 12 000 km

Estimated surface water supply to the natural regime from 1940/41 to 1985/86:

- Maximum 29 726 hm³
- Average 18 217 hm³
- Minimum 8 393 hm³

This large and varied territory is home to some 3 019 176 inhabitants, which represents a population density of 33 inhabitants/km^{2}, well below the Spanish average (78 inhabitants/km^{2}). Almost half of the population is concentrated in the cities of Zaragoza, Vitoria, Logroño, Pamplona, Huesca and Lérida. There is a concentration of population in the riparian areas in the center of the valley and large areas empty of human population in the Iberian System, the interior steppes, the interior pre-Pyrenees and the Pyrenees.

== Wetlands ==
In the middle stretch of the river there are a large number of lagoons that are fed directly from the river aquifer due to its natural dynamics, which causes the water to circulate through the ground. Where the ground is below the water table, lagoons form in the meanders abandoned by the Ebro or its tributaries or in hollows of the land due to subsidence because the subsoil plaster is dissolved by the groundwater and ends up collapsing forming chasms or sinkholes that when water emerges are popularly called "Ojos" (Eyes). They are part of this abundant set present or buried for cultivation, for example the lagoons of Larralde, Ojo del Fraile, Ojo del Cura and Galachos, all around Zaragoza capital, but they are numerous in any other province of the riverbed. These lagoons or flood lakes are more common in the middle stretch of the Ebro.

There are also numerous endorheic lagoons such as the Sariñena lagoon in Huesca, the Montcornés lagoon in Lérida or the salty lagoon of Chiprana (Zaragoza). The largest in the area of the Ebro Hydrographic Confederation is the Gallocanta lagoon, located in an endorheic basin, with no external outlet of 541 km^{2} of basin, which forms one (when it is completely full) or three lagoons depending on the amount of rainfall it receives. The endorheic lagoons that still persist are the remains of the Cenozoic seas or Pliocene residual lakes and usually have a very characteristic and rare endemic fauna and flora with some large species such as the crane, flamingo, or the alcaraván.

Among the wetland projects are the restoration and conditioning of the El Cañizar lake in Villarquemado, (Teruel), and that of Bayas, in Miranda de Ebro (Burgos), completed in 2010; the improvement of the Ojos de Pontil, in Rueda de Jalón (Zaragoza) and the conditioning of the wetland environment in La Sima, in Rubielos de la Cérida (Teruel), both completed in 2011. The organization is also carrying out the environmental restoration of the wetland of the Guaso riverbank on the right bank of the Ara river, in Aínsa (Huesca) and the improvement and conservation of the Larralde pond (Zaragoza) and the restoration of the riverbed of the Queiles river in Los Fayos (Zaragoza).

But the great wetland of the basin is located in the Mediterranean, the Ebro Delta, of 7,736 hectares. It is a Ramsar Convention site, ZEPA area and Tierras del Ebro Biosphere Reserve.

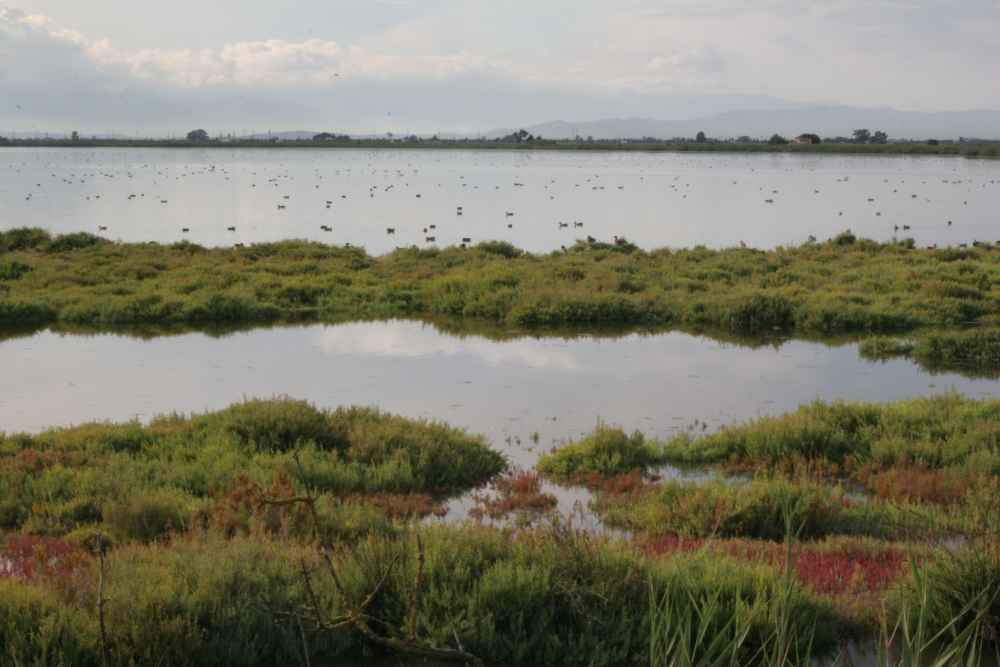
The flood lake of the Galacho de Juslibol during a flooding of the Ebro River

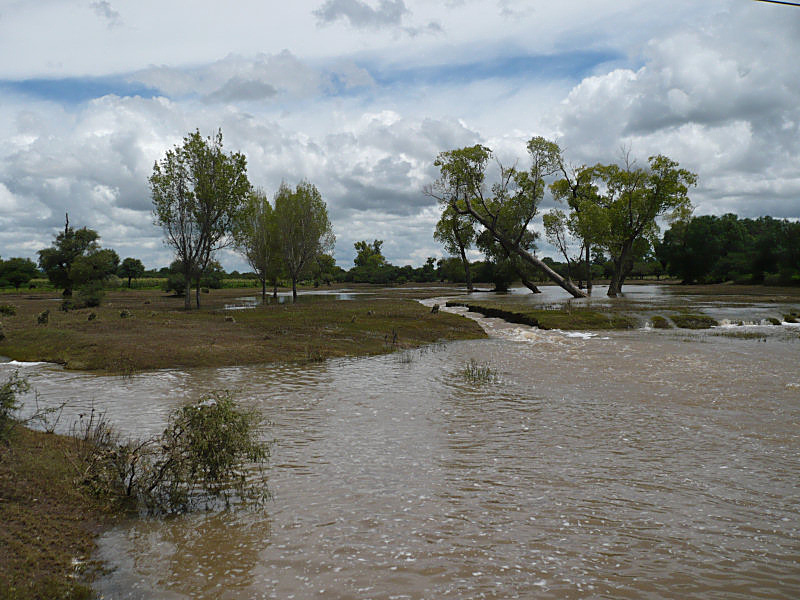
The Ojo del Cura is a typical karstic lagoon located in the middle Ebro, fed by the overflow of the river aquifer.

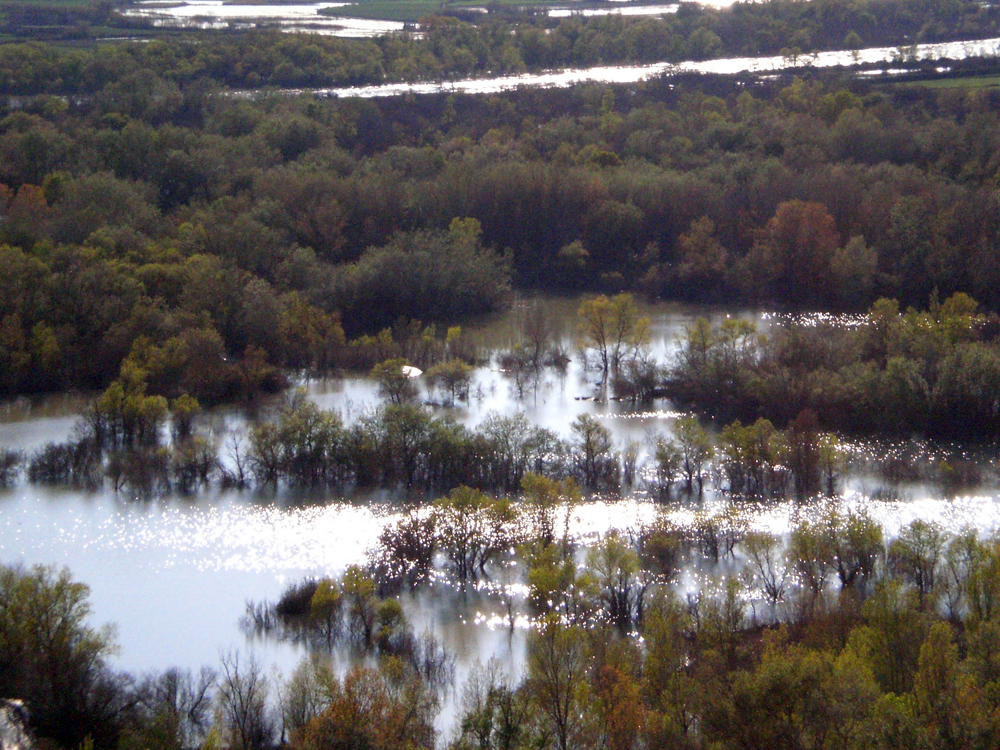
The flood lake of the Galacho de Juslibol during a flooding of the Ebro River

== Confederation reservoirs ==
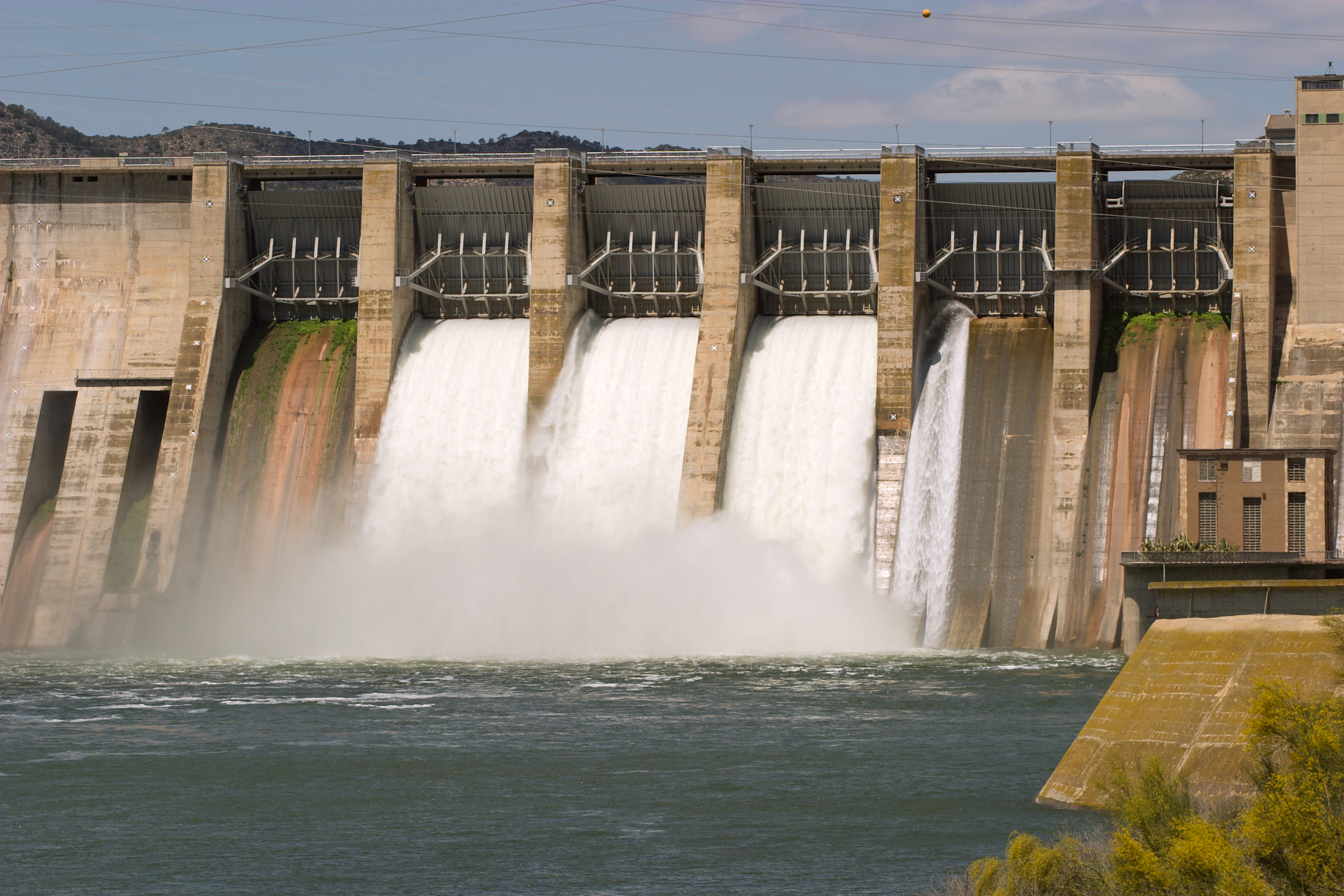
Mequinenza hydroelectric power plant

- Mequinenza reservoir: 1,530 hm³ (1965), lower Ebro section
- Ebro reservoir: 540 hm³ (1952), headwaters of the Ebro river
- Yesa reservoir: 446.86 hm³ (1959) - Yesa dam enlarged 1 100 hm³, Aragón river.
- Mediano reservoir: 436.35 hm³ (1973), Cínca river.
- Itoiz reservoir: 418 hm³ (2010)*, Iratí river, tributary of the Aragón.
- Rialb reservoir: 402 hm³ (2000), Segre river.
- El Grado I reservoir: 399.48 hm³ (1969), Cínca river.
- Santa Ana reservoir: 236.60 hm³ (1961), Noguera-Ribagorzana.
- La Sotonera reservoir: 189.38 hm³ (1963), Astón-Sotón river with waters of the Gállego.
- Oliana reservoir: 101.10 hm³ (1959), Segre river.
- Joaquín Costa reservoir or Barasona reservoir: 91.70 hm³ (1932), Ésera river.
- La Tranquera reservoir: 84.17 hm³ (1960), Piedra river, tributary of the Jalón.
- Caspe reservoir: 81.62 hm³ (1991), Guadalope river.
- Ribarroja: lower stretch of the Ebro.
- Mansilla reservoir: 68 hm³ (1960). Najerilla river. La Rioja
- Pajares reservoir: 35.29 hm³ (1995), Lumbreras river. La Rioja
- González Lacasa or Ortigosa reservoir: 33 hm³ (1962). Albercos river. La Rioja
- El Val reservoir: 24 hm³ (1997), Val river with waters of the Queiles.

== Headquarters ==
Ebro Hydrographic Confederation Headquarters
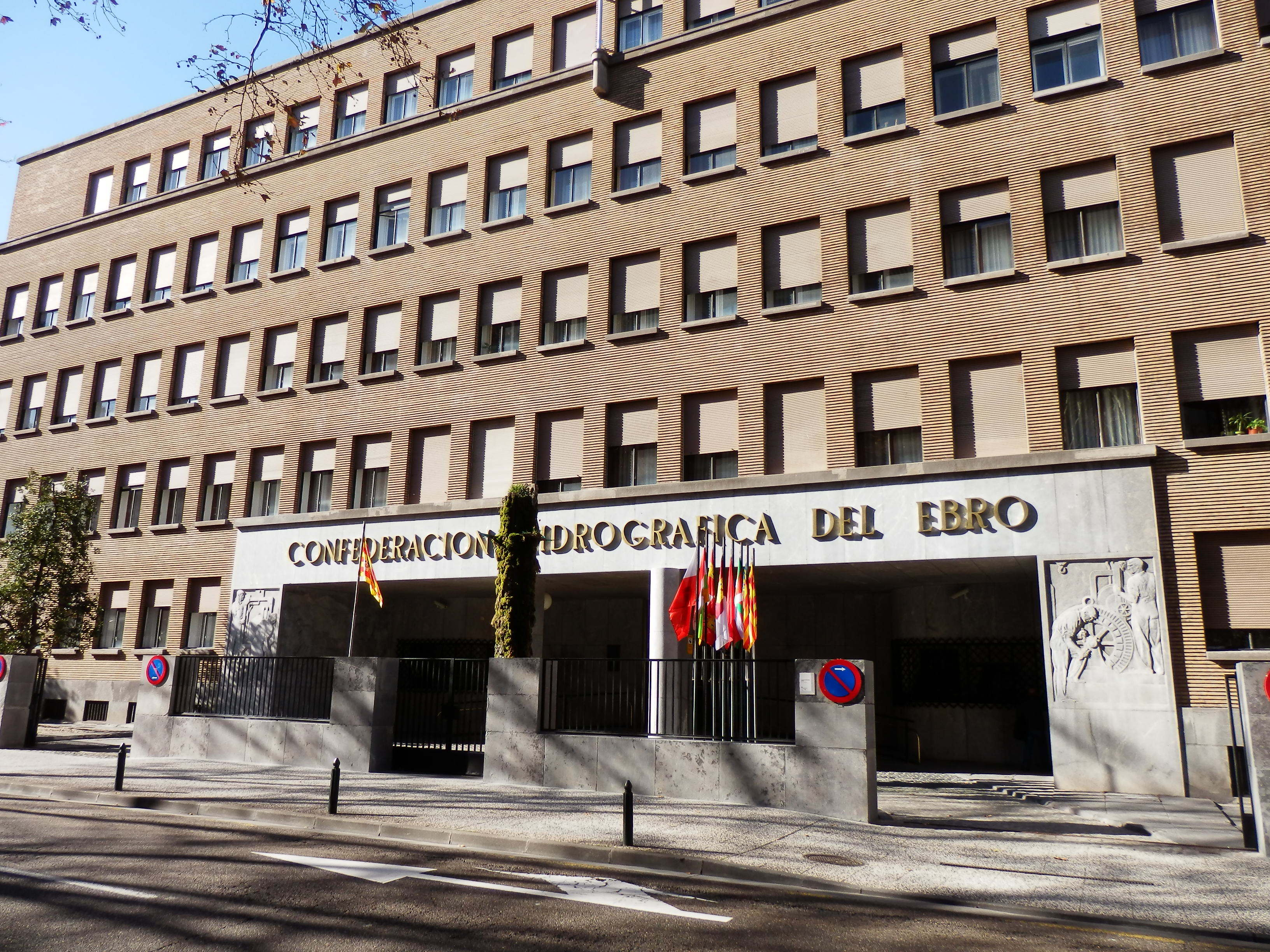
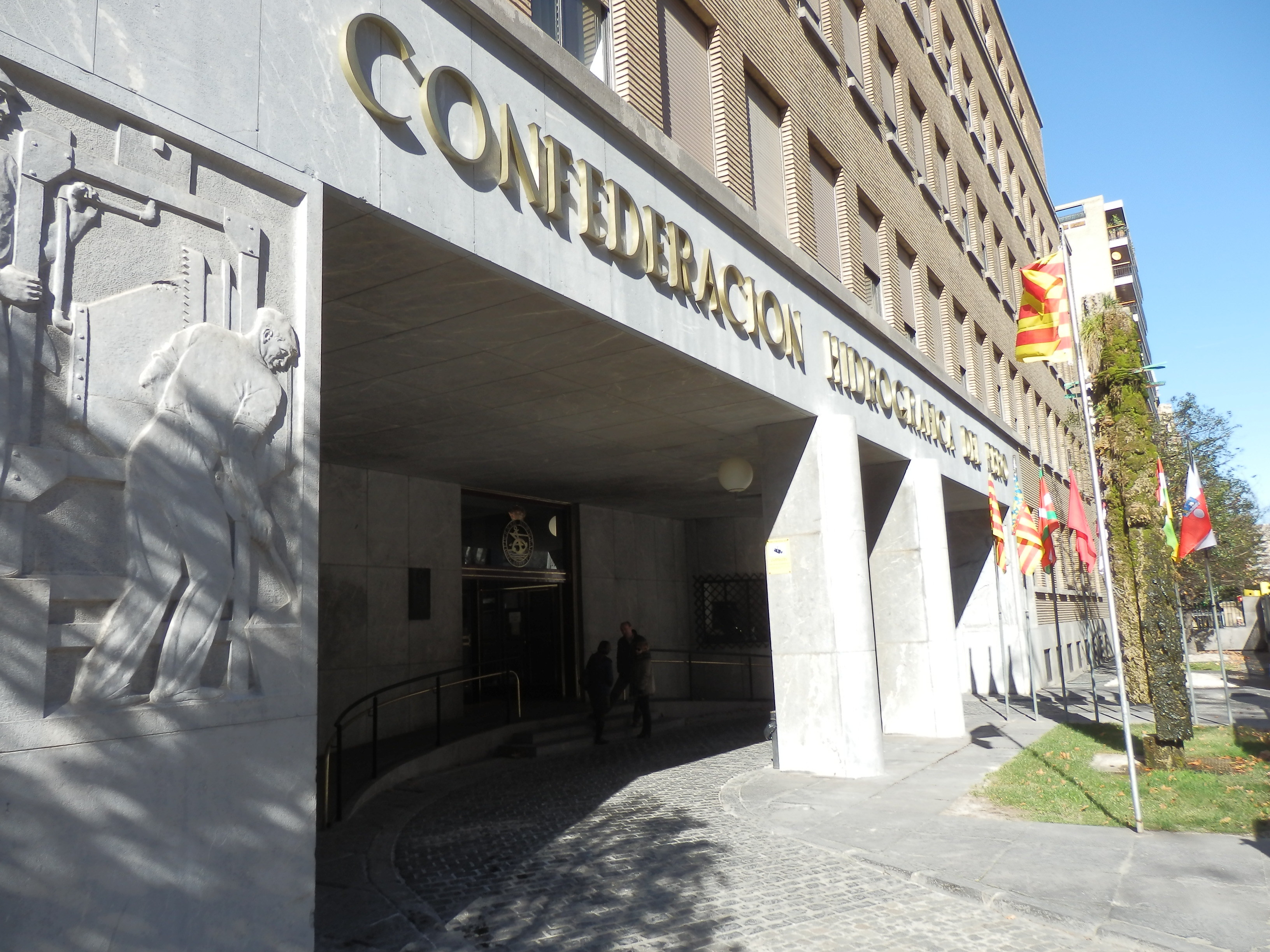
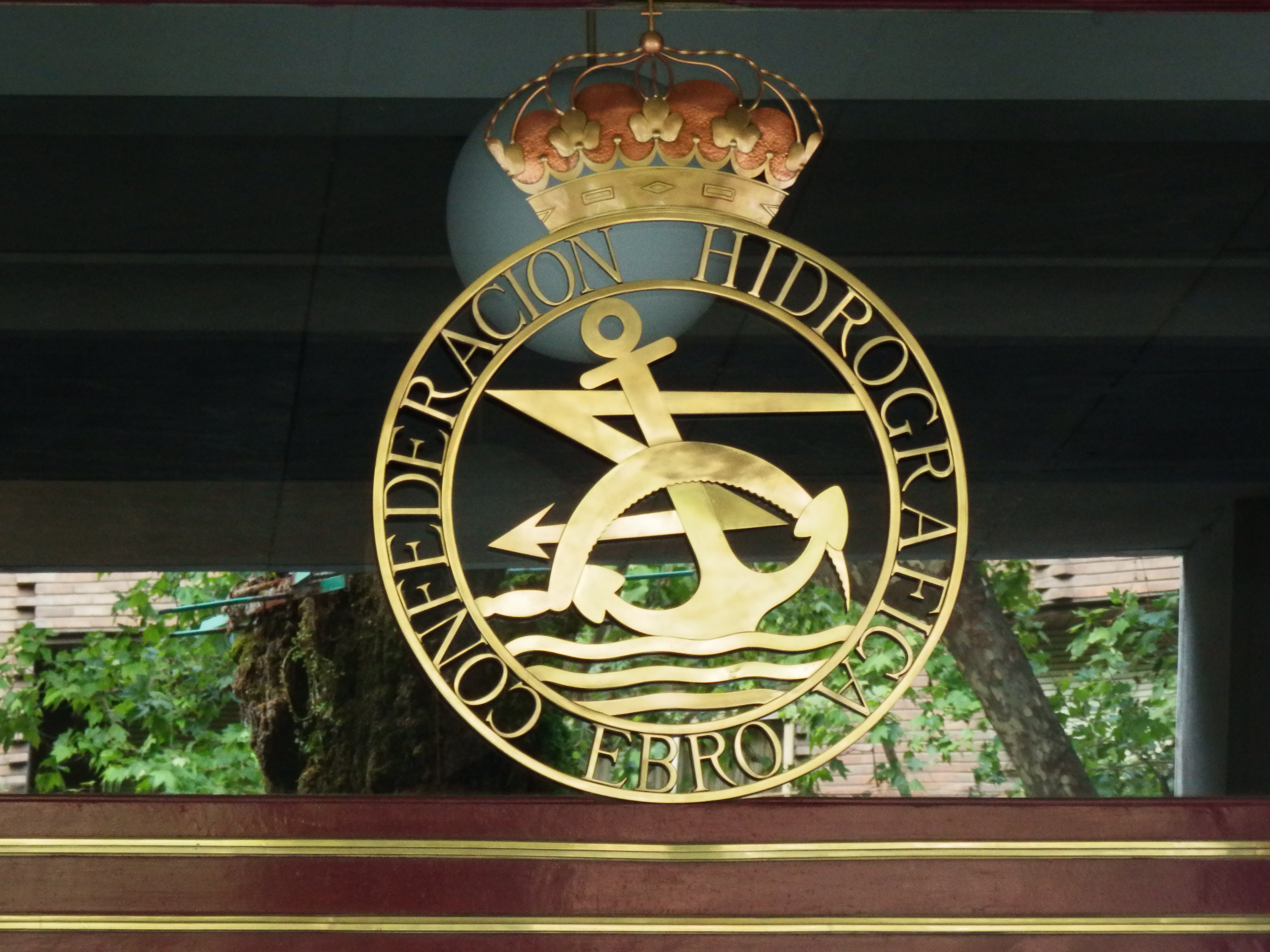

General information
- Location: 41°38′41″N 00°53′10″W, Paseo de Sagasta, 24-26, Zaragoza
- Year built: March 5. 2926
- Construction started: April, 1936
- Construction stopped: December, 1946

Design and construction
- Architects: Regino Borobio Ojeda and José Borbobio Ojeda

Website
- www.chebro.es

From October 1926 Regino Borobio Ojeda was the consulting architect of the CHE for which he carried out in the Ebro basin projects of agricultural farms, garages, schools, housing and offices in reservoirs. In 1929 he designed and built the Ebro Hydrographic Confederation Pavilion for the Barcelona Universal Exposition.

Initially the CHE was installed in premises distributed in 7 different buildings. From 1928 it was installed in a building at number 20, Paseo de Sagasta, according to a project by Pascual Bravo. In 1933 it needed an extension of 6,000 m^{2}.

On February 4, 1933, the competition for preliminary projects for the CHE headquarters was announced. On April 13, 1933, the jury decided and the work was awarded to Regino Borobio Ojeda and José Borobio Ojeda. Work began in April 1936 and was completed in December 1946. The building is functional. It is located at Paseo de Sagasta, 24–26.

== See also ==
- Guadalquivir Hydrographic Confederation
- Júcar Hydrographic Confederation
- Tagus Hydrographic Confederation
- Ebro valley
- Ebro sedimentary basin

== Bibliography ==
- Fernández Clemente, Eloy (2013). "Una gran herencia de Joaquín Costa: la Confederación Hidrográfica del Ebro" (PDF). Vegueta. Anuario de la Facultad de Geografía e Historia. 13: 65–76. ISSN 1133-598X. Archived from the original (PDF) on 22 December 2015. (in Spanish)
- UTRERA CARO, Sebastián Félix, La incidencia ambiental de las obras hidráulicas: régimen jurídico, Librería-Editorial Dykinson, 2002, 310 pp. ISBN 978-84-8155-913-2 (in Spanish)
- PNILLA NAVARRO, Vicente, Gestión y usos del agua en la cuenca del Ebro en el siglo XX, Universidad de Zaragoza, 2008, 759 pp. ISBN 978-84-7733-997-7 (in Spanish)
- LORENZO PARDO, Manuel, Por el Pantano del Ebro: un convencido más, 1918, 24 pp. (in Spanish)
- LORENZO PARDO, Manuel, Uriarte: recuerdos de la vida de un gran ingeniero, Tipografía del Heraldo, 1919, 237 pp. (in Spanish)
- LORENZO PARDO, Manuel, Aforo de corrientes, Espasa-Calpe, 1926, 35 pp. (in Spanish)
- LORENZO PARDO, Manuel, Nueva política hidráulica: la Confederación del Ebro, Campañía ibero-Americana de publicaciones, 1930, 214 pp. (in Spanish)
- LORENZO PARDO, Manuel, Manuel Lorenzo Pardo (1881-1953): escritos publicados en la Revista de Obras Públicas, Colegio de Ingenieros de Caminos, Canales y Puertos, 2003, 151 pp. ISBN 978-84-380-0247-6 (in Spanish)
- BOROBIO OJEDA, Regino, BOROBIO OJEDA, José, Edificio de la Confederación hidrográgica del Ebro: Zaragoza 1933, Servicio Publicaciones ETSA, 1999, 63 pp. ISBN 978-84-89713-20-8 (in Spanish)
