= List of dams and reservoirs in Aragon =

This is a list of dams and reservoirs in Aragon, Spain.

== List ==
Name	Location	Image
Almochuel reservoir		
Arguis Reservoir		
Arquillo de San Blas reservoir		
Bachimaña Alto reservoir		
Balagueras Reservoir		
Barasona reservoir		
Baserca reservoir		
Búbal reservoir		
El Val reservoir		
Calanda reservoir		
Canelles Reservoir		
Canfranc reservoir		
Caspe reservoir		
Cienfuens reservoir		
Cueva Foradada reservoir		
El Grado Reservoir		
El Grado II reservoir		
Embalse Valbona Valbona		
Escales Reservoir		
Escarra Reservoir		
Gallipuén Reservoir		
Horcajo´s reservoir		
Ibón de Bachimaña Alto		
Ip reservoir		
Jánovas Reservoir		
La Estanca		
La Loteta reservoir		
La Peña Reservoir		
Lanuza Reservoir		
Las Torcas reservoir		
La Sarra reservoir		
Reservoir of La Sotonera		
Reservoir of La Tranquera		
Reservoir of Maidevera		
Mediano Reservoir		
Reservoir of Mequinenza		
Montearagón reservoir		
Mularroya reservoir		
Pantà de Llauset		
Pantà de Santa Anna		
Paso Nuevo Reservoir		
Pantano de Escuriza		
Respomuso Reservoir		
San Bartolomé reservoir		
San Gregorio reservoir		
Santolea Reservoir		
Santa María de Belsué Reservoir		
Tramacastilla reservoir		
Vadiello Reservoir		
Valdepatao reservoir		
Yesa Reservoir		

== See also ==
- List of dams and reservoirs
- List of dams and reservoirs in Spain
