= Gran Enciclopedia Aragonesa =

The Gran Enciclopedia Aragonesa (Great Aragonese Encyclopedia, commonly abbreviated GEA) is a Spanish language, Aragon-themed, encyclopedia.

It was first published in 1981, under the direction of Eloy Fernández Clemente. In 1999, Prensa Diaria Aragonesa SA, the editor of the newspaper El Periódico de Aragón acquired the rights to the encyclopedia and published a new edition the following year, selling over 8,000 copies. They added an appendix in 2003. They began to scan the encyclopedia in 2002, and in September 2003 released version 1.0 of the On-Line Great Aragonese Encyclopedia. It was offered free on the Internet, with the support of the Government of the Autonomous Community of Aragon, between 2003 and 2022.
