= Canelles Reservoir =

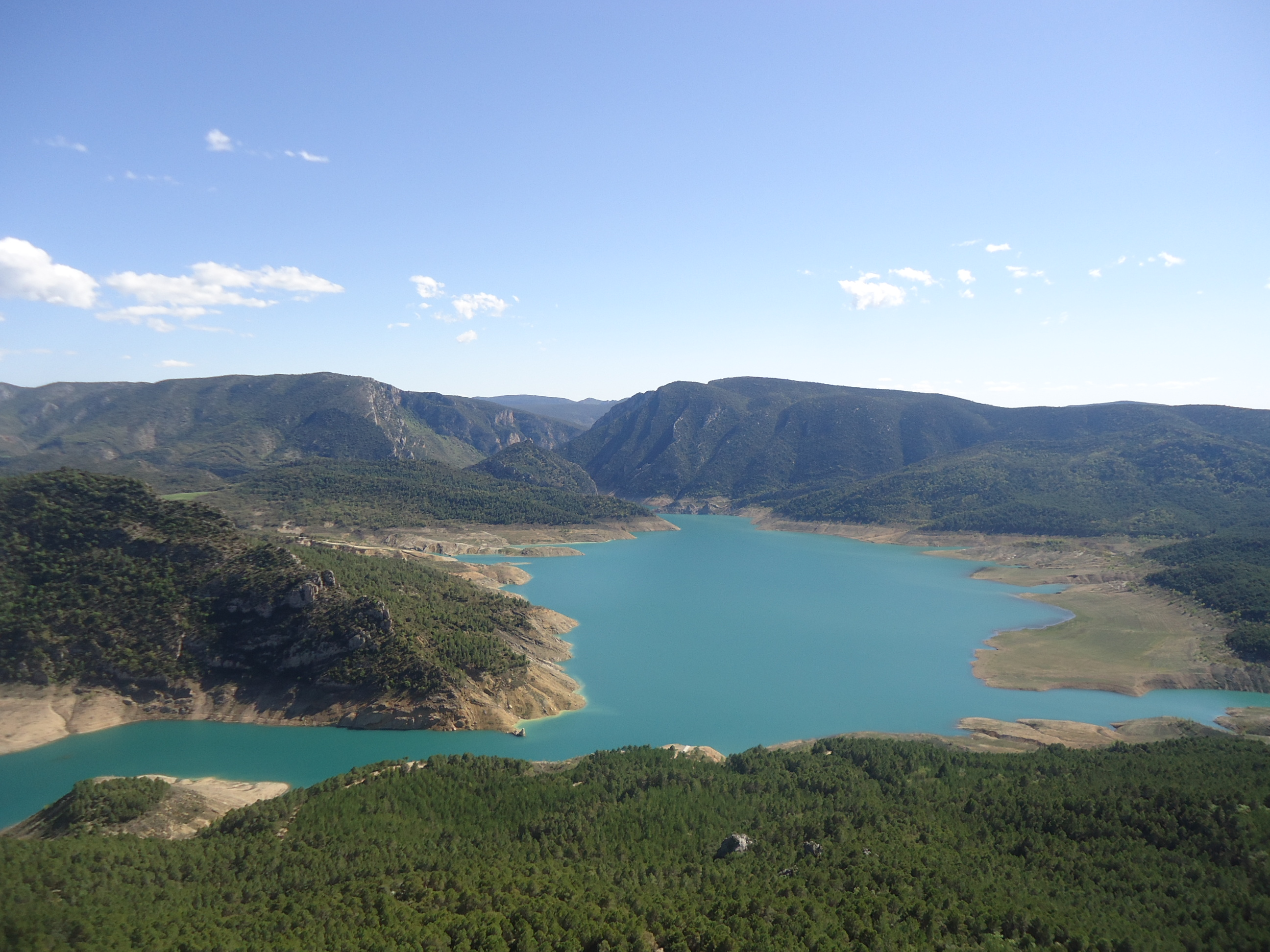
- View of the reservoir

- Location of the Canelles Reservoir
- Country: Spain
- Location: Lleida Province and Huesca Province
- Coordinates: 41°58′43″N 0°36′44″E
- Status: Operational
- Opening date: 1960

Dam and spillways
- Type of dam: Gravity dam
- Impounds: Noguera Ribagorzana
- Height: 150 m (490 ft)
- Length: 210 m (690 ft)
- Width (base): 80 m (260 ft)

Reservoir
- Total capacity: 687.5 hm³
- Catchment area: 182 km^{2}
- Surface area: 1569 ha

Power Station
- Installed capacity: 108 MW

Canelles Reservoir is a reservoir in the Pre-Pyrenees area in Spain. It is located in the Noguera Ribagorzana river bordering the province of Huesca, Aragon and the province of Lleida, Catalonia. It was built by the Spanish power utility ENHER.

The reservoir irrigates the Aragon and Catalonia canals through the Santa Anna reservoir.

The Canelles dam is 151 meters high, the 3rd highest in the country. It was the country's highest dam when its construction was completed in 1960.

== See also ==
- List of dams and reservoirs in Aragon
- List of dams and reservoirs in Catalonia
