= Ibón de Bachimaña Alto =

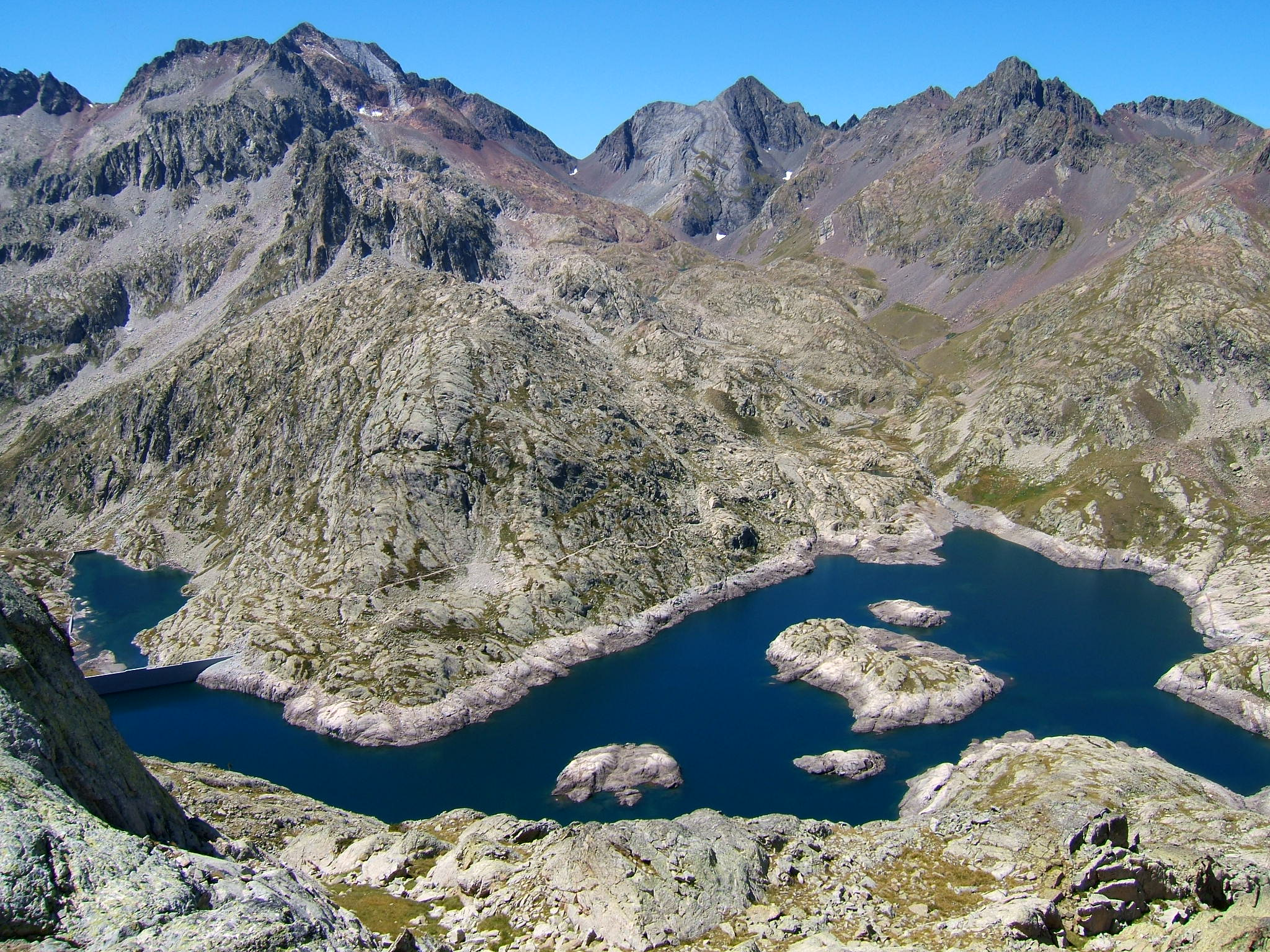
- Ibón de Bachimaña Bajo (top left) and Ibón de Bachimaña Alto (foreground)

- Location within Spain
- Location: Tena Valley, Province of Huesca, Spain
- Coordinates: 42.785°N 0.222°W
- Type: glacial lake
- Surface area: 38 hectares (0.15 sq mi)
- Surface elevation: 2,207 metres (7,241 ft)

Ibón de Bachimaña Bajo
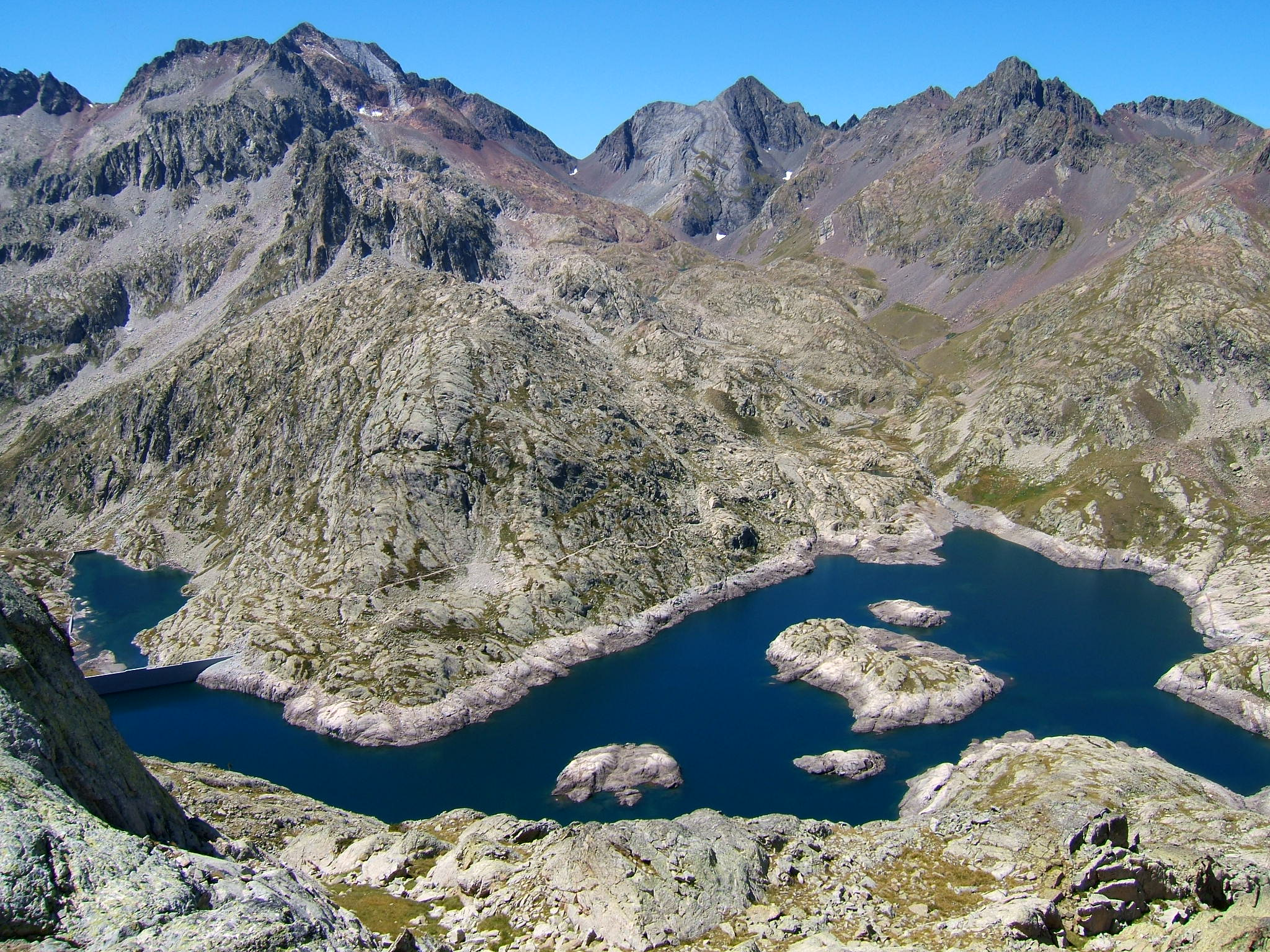
- Ibón de Bachimaña Bajo (top left) and Ibón de Bachimaña Alto (foreground)

- Location within Spain
- Location: Tena Valley, Province of Huesca, Spain
- Coordinates: 42.781354°N 0.226865°W
- Type: glacial lake
- Surface area: 3.2 hectares (0.012 sq mi)
- Surface elevation: 2,190 metres (7,190 ft)

Ibón de Bachimaña Alto and Ibón de Bachimaña Bajo are glacial lakes in the Tena Valley in the Province of Huesca, northeastern Spain, near the border with France. Ibón de Bachimaña Alto, the larger, lies at an elevation of 2,207 metres (7,241 ft) above sea level. It covers an area of 38 hectares (0.15 sq mi).

Ibón de Bachimaña Bajo lies at 2,190 metres (7,190 ft) above sea level and has a surface area of 3.2 hectares (0.012 sq mi). It is currently separated from the larger Ibón de Bachimaña Alto by a dam and is used as a reservoir.
