= Larralde =

Larralde is a surname. Notable people with the surname include:

- José Larralde (born 1937), Argentine musician
- Marta Larralde (born 1981), Spanish actress
- Romulo Larralde (1902–1976), Mexican actor better known as Romney Brent
- Valentín Larralde (born 2000), Argentine footballer
