= ENHER =

ENHER, the acronym for Empresa Nacional Hidroeléctrica del Ribagorzana (National Hydroelectric Company of the Ribagorzana), was a Spanish company, based in Barcelona, dedicated to the generation and distribution of electrical energy. Its basic activity focused on hydroelectric production, but also had holdings in thermal and nuclear power stations.

Created in 1946, it was historically a company of public capital, first as property of Instituto Nacional de Industria (INI) and, from 1983, as part of Endesa, who absorbed it in 1999, one year after being privatized. Despite the extinction of the legal personality of Enher, Endesa used the Fecsa-Enher trademark for its distribution activity in Catalonia until the year 2001.

== History ==
ENHER was founded in 1946 with majority capital of Instituto Nacional de Industria (INI) at the initiative of the engineer Victoriano Muñoz Oms, in order to take advantage of the hydraulic resources of the basin of the Noguera-Ribagorçana river. Subsequently, he also obtained concessions in the Ebro and in the Cinca rivers.

In the 1960s the Spanish economic growth and the increase in electrical demand led Enher to seek new energy sources, beyond waterfalls. In 1967, together with the company Hidroeléctrica de Cataluña (HECSA), built a thermal power plant of 150 MW in Sant Adrià de Besós, named Besós I. In 1968 Enher and HECSA constituted 50% of the company Térmicas del Besós, S.A. (TERBESA) to administer this center and also a second group, Besós II, inaugurated in 1972, in addition to other thermal installations such as the thermal power plant of Foix, connected to the network in 1979.

In the nuclear field, it was also part, with 23%, of Hispano Francesa de Energía Nuclear, S.A. (Hifrensa), a consortium of companies integrated by Electricité de France (EdF) and the other large Catalan electric ones, FECSA and HECSA, to build the first Catalan and third Spanish nuclear power station, Vandellós I, which entered service in 1972. It also participated in the Ascó Nuclear Association II with a 40% stake. In 1981 the construction of Vandellós II nuclear power station was authorized, project in which ENHER participated with 54% capital.

The reorganization of the electric sector carried out by the Spanish government meant that in 1983 the INI transferred to Endesa, also public, all its shareholdings in electric companies, including ENHER. To reduce its debt, ENHER transferred to Endesa its nuclear shares in Vandellos II (54%) and Ascó II (40%).

Following an agreement for the exchange of assets signed by Endesa and Iberdrola, in 1994 ENHER acquired 55% of Hidruña 1, a company to which all the assets of HECSA, except nuclear ones, had been moved to. Finally, in 1998 Hidruña was absorbed by ENHER, who with this operation reached 1.6 million clients, which supposed 50% of the Catalan market and 15% of the Aragonese one. In turn, it added 35,000 km of lines and more than 9,000 MW of installed power.

In 1999 ENHER was absorbed by Endesa, who a year before had been privatized; the exchange of securities was 24 shares of Enher for 25 of Endesa. Before the merger by absorption, ENHER and FECSA, company which was also absorbed, segregated their assets of non-nuclear power generation and distribution to a new company, called Fecsa-Enher I, SA, controlled 100% by Endesa. Subsequently, the generation assets were split into the other company, Fecsa-Enher II, SA Endesa operated in the distribution market of Catalonia through the subsidiary Fecsa-Enher until the year 2001, when it changed the brand to Fecsa-Endesa.

== Headquarters ==
ENHER had its headquarters in the Casa Fuster, modernist style building by the architect Lluís Domènech i Montaner, located at number 132 of the Paseo de Gracia of Barcelona. The electric company purchased the property in 1960 for 11 million pesetas, with the intention of demolishing it to build a skyscraper of offices named "Torre Barcelona". However, after a campaign in favor of its preservation in several news media, ENHER dismissed the demolition project and installed its offices in the historic building, carrying out a restoration that culminated in 1974. In the year 2000 Endesa sold the ENHER's headquarters building, which became a hotel, currently protected as Cultural Good of Local Interest .

== Hydraulic production assets ==
ENHER's main hydraulic production assets were as follows:

- CH Senet - Starting operation in 1951
- CH Vilaller - Starting operation in 1952
- CH Bono - Starting operation in 1953
- CH Llesp - Starting operation in 1953
- CH Pont de Suert - Starting operation in 1955
- CH Escales - Starting operation in 1955
- CH Boï - Starting operation in 1956
- CH Caldes - Starting operation in 1958
- CH Pont de Montanyana - Starting operation in 1958
- CH Canelles - Starting operation in 1959
- CH Santa Anna - Starting operation in 1962
- CH Mequinenza - Starting operation in 1964
- CH Riba-Roja - Starting operation in 1967
- CH Moralets-Baserca-Llauset

== Technologies for managing electrical assets ==
Along with hydraulic and electrical infrastructures, ENHER developed ICT technologies applied to the management and control of these infrastructures. Examples include developments in the fields of computer networking (TRAME network) and Remote Control..
