= Mequinenza Dam =

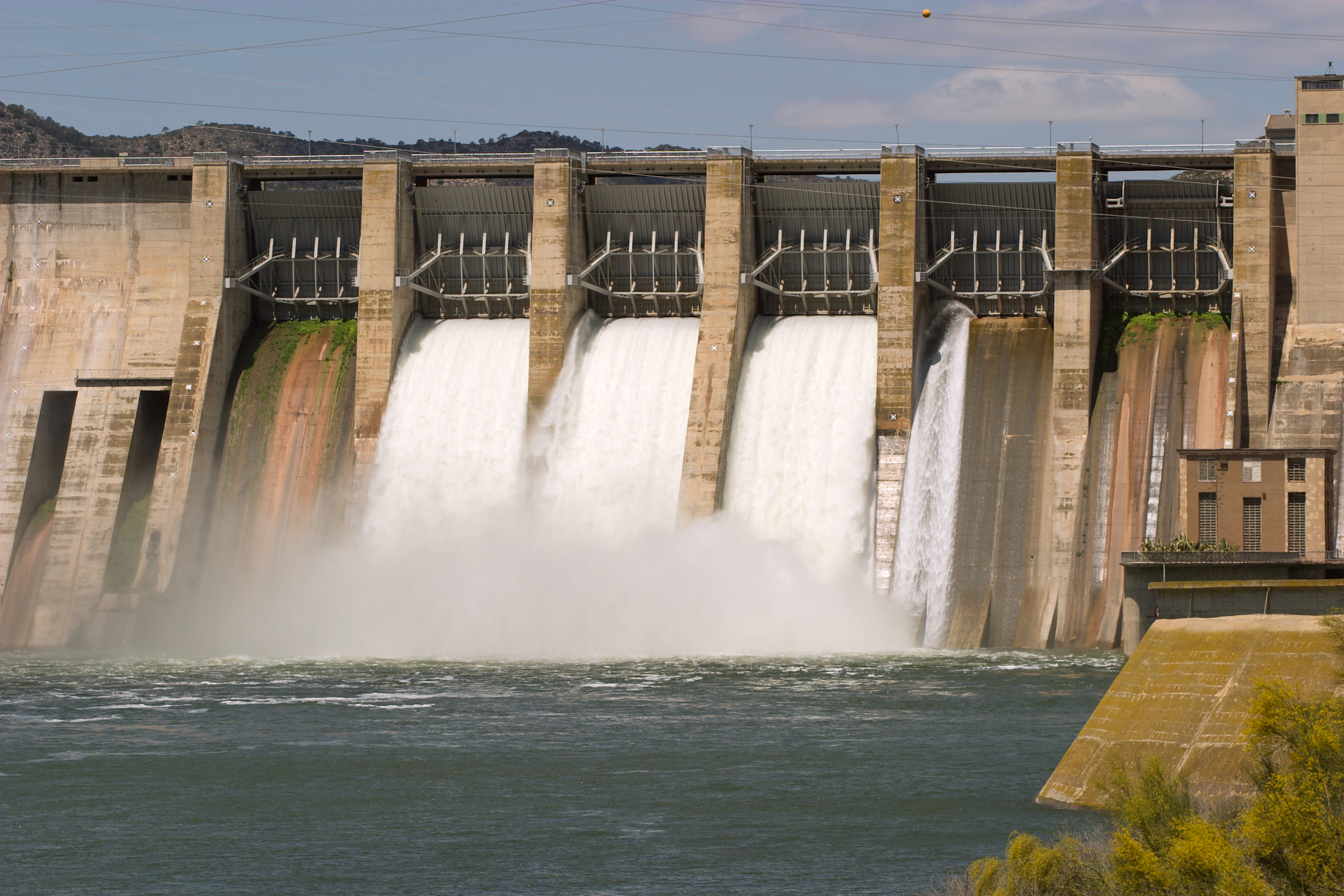

- Location within Spain
- Official name: Presa de Mequinenza
- Location: Province of Zaragoza, Spain
- Coordinates: 41.368983°N 0.273381°E
- Purpose: Power
- Status: Operational
- Construction began: 1957
- Opening date: 1964
- Owner: Endesa
- Operator: Endesa

Dam and spillways
- Type of dam: Concrete gravity dam
- Impounds: Ebro
- Height (foundation): 79 m (259 ft)
- Length: 461 m (1,512 ft)
- Elevation at crest: 124 m (407 ft)
- Dam volume: 1,100,000 m^{3} (39,000,000 cu ft)
- Spillway type: Over the dam
- Spillway capacity: 11,000 m^{3}/s (8.9 acre⋅ft/s)

Reservoir
- Total capacity: 1,530,000,000 m^{3} (1,240,000 acre⋅ft)
- Surface area: 75.4 km^{2} (29.1 mi^{2})
- Maximum length: 110 km (68 mi)
- Maximum width: 600 m (2,000 ft)
- Maximum water depth: 62 m (203 ft)
- Normal elevation: 121 m (397 ft)

Power Station
- Commission date: 1966
- Turbines: 4 x 96 MW Francis-type
- Installed capacity: 384 MW

Mequinenza Dam (Spanish: Presa de Mequinenza) is a concrete gravity dam in the province of Zaragoza, Spain. It impounds the Ebro creating a large reservoir, which is called Mar de Aragón. About 35 km downstream of Mequinenza dam is Ribarroja dam.

Empresa Nacional Hidroeléctrica del Ribagorzana S.A. (ENHER) was mandated in 1955 by Instituto Nacional de Industria (INI) to build two dams on the Ebro near Mequinenza and Ribarroja. Work on Mequinenza dam started in 1957. The filling of the reservoir began in December 1965. The power plant was operational in 1964 (1966). ENHER was acquired by Endesa in 1999.

== Dam ==
Mequinenza Dam is a 79 m tall (height above foundation) and 461 m long gravity dam with a crest altitude of 124 m. The volume of the dam is 1,100,000 m^{3}. The dam features a spillway with 6 gates over the dam (maximum discharge 11,000 m^{3}/s) and one bottom outlet (maximum discharge 160 m^{3}/s).

== Reservoir ==
At full reservoir level of 121 m.a.s.l. the reservoir has a surface area of 75.4 km^{2}, a total capacity of 1.53 billion m^{3} and a length of almost 110 km. The average width of the reservoir is about 600 m, its maximum (average) depth is 62 (20) m.

== Power plant ==
The power plant contains 4 Francis turbine-generators. The initial nameplate capacity was 81 MW each. The turbines, generators and transformers were refurbished from 2007 until 2010 raising the capacity of the new machines to 96 MW each. Maximum flow is 150 m^{3}/s per turbine.

== See also ==
- List of power stations in Spain
- List of dams and reservoirs in Spain
