= Eloy Fernández Clemente =

Spanish economist (1942–2022)

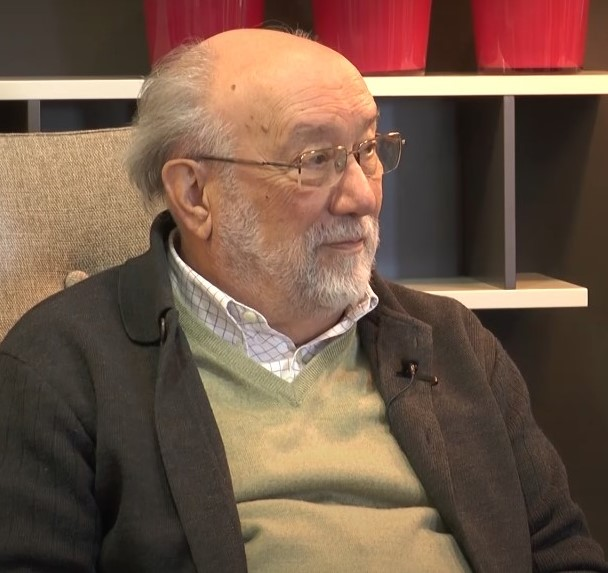
- Born: 13 December 1942; Andorra, Teruel, Spain
- Died: 17 December 2022 (aged 80); Zaragoza, Spain
- Occupation(s): Economist, professor, Historian
- Employer: University of Zaragoza
- Awards: Real Academia de Ciencias Morales y Políticas

Eloy Fernández Clemente (13 December 1942 – 17 December 2022) was a Spanish economist and historian.

== Biography ==
Born in the town of Andorra, in Aragón, Fernández Clemente was the founder and director of the Andalán magazine (1972–1977 and 1982–1987), and also directed the Great Aragonese Encyclopedia (1978–1982). He was part of the founding nucleus of the Socialist Party of Aragon (PSA). He was a professor of Economic History at the Faculty of Economic and Business Sciences of the University of Zaragoza, of which he was dean from 1996 to 1999.

Fernández Clemente died in Zaragoza on 17 December 2022, at the age of 80.

== Works ==
- Education and revolution in Joaquín Costa and a brief pedagogical anthology (1969).
- The Aragonese Illustration (1969).
- Contemporary Aragon 1833-1936 (1975).
- Studies on Joaquín Costa (1989).
- Ulysses in the 20th century. Crisis and modernization in Greece, 1900-1930 (1995).
- Portugal in the twenties. The origins of the New State (1996).
- People of Order. Aragon during the dictatorship of Primo de Rivera (1923-1930) (1997).
- A century of hydraulic works in Spain: from Joaquín Costa's utopia to State intervention (2000).
- The memory that we are. Memoirs, 1942-1972 (2010).
- The years of Andalán. Memories, 1972-1987 (2013).
- Teson and melancholy. Memories, 1987-2012 (2015).

== Other websites ==
- Eloy Fernández Clemente en Eumed.Net
