= Amadeo Marco Ilincheta =

Spanish politician

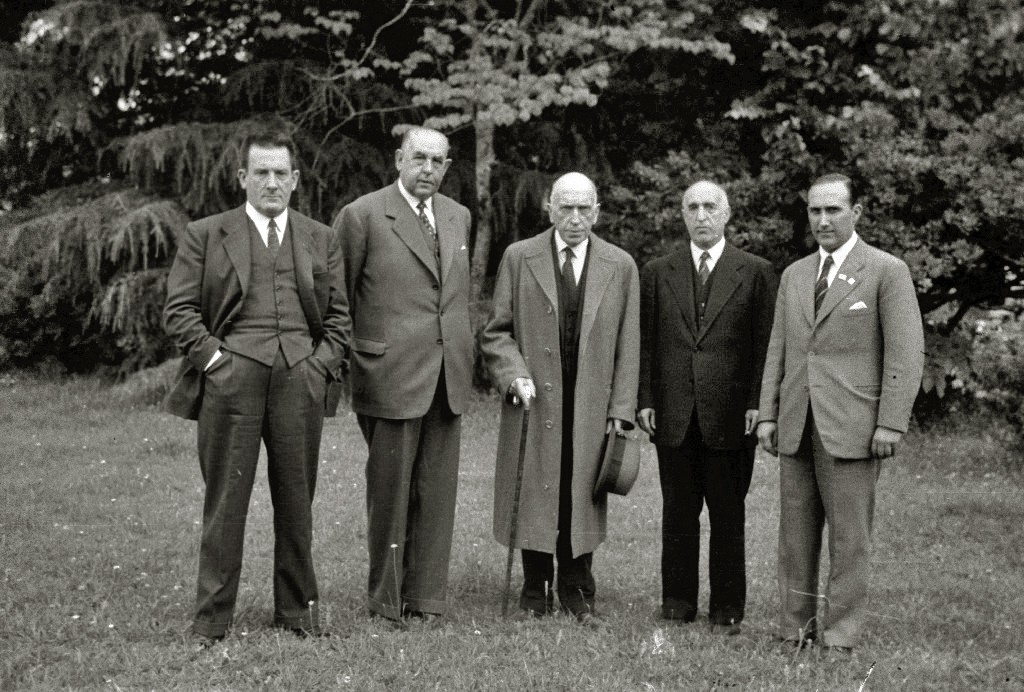
- Born: Amadeo Marco Ilincheta; 1900; Navascués, Spain
- Died: 1987 (aged 86–87); Navascués, Spain
- Occupation: entrepreneur
- Known for: politician
- Political party: Carlism, FET, AFN

Amadeo Marco Ilincheta (1900–1987) was a Spanish Traditionalist politician, until 1942 active within the Carlist movement and afterwards in the Francoist structures. He is best known as the iconic Navarrese personality of the Franco era, principally as a longtime member of the regional self-government, Diputación Foral. He served as representative of the Aoiz-Sangüesa district in 1931 and then continuously during 6 successive terms in 1940–1979; during a few strings he was acting president of the Diputation. In 1943–1954 and in 1967–1977 he held a seat in the Francoist Cortes. In 1942–1954 he was a member of the Falange Española Tradicionalista executive, Consejo Nacional. Since 1927 he intermittently served as the mayor of Navascués.

== Family and youth ==
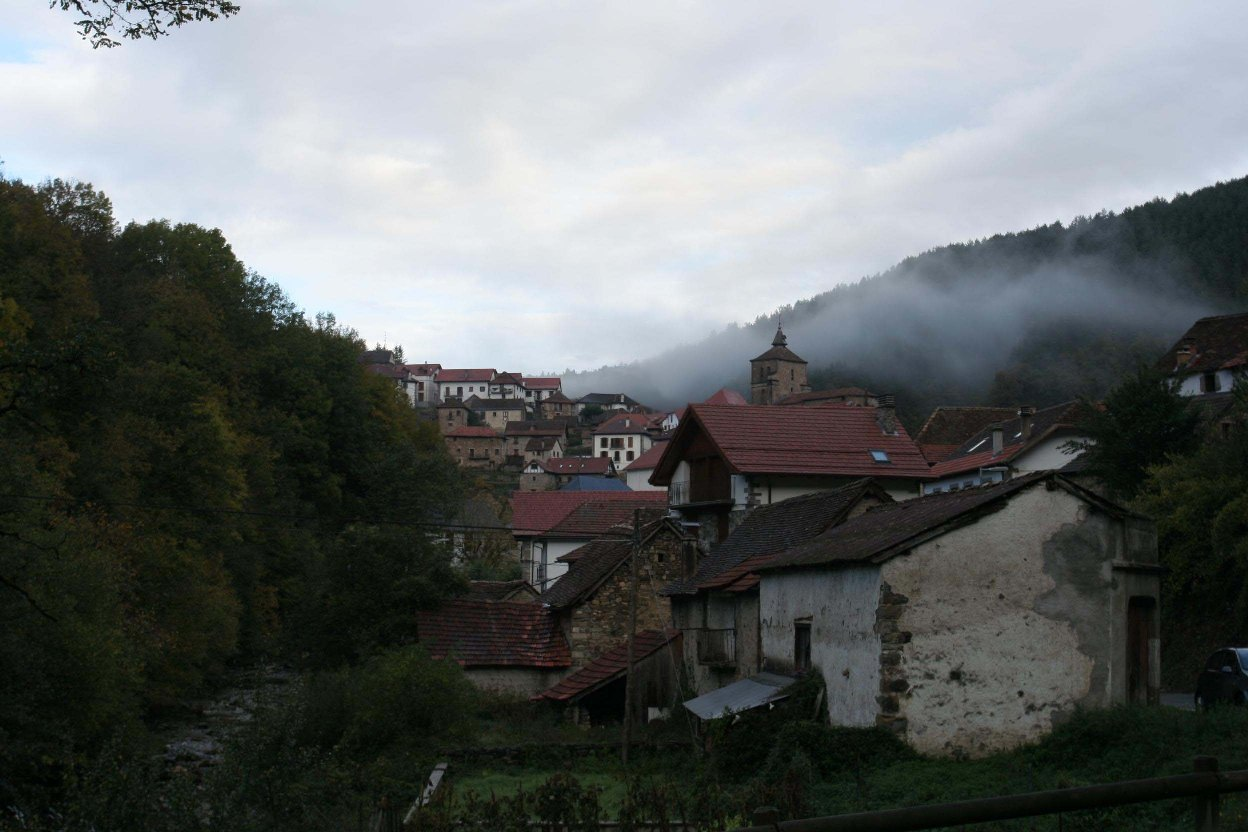
Uztárroz

The Marco family has been for centuries related to Valle de Roncal, a mountainous Pyrenean community in North-Eastern Navarre. Its first representatives were noted in the 12th century and their descendants grew to major local positions in the early modern period; in the late 16th century Pedro Marco from Uztárroz was nominated Almirante del Valle de Roncal, and his relatives held alcaldia of Uztárroz in the mid-17th century. The Marcos have aspired to the nobility status and got their hidalguia confirmed in the late 18th century. At the time the strictly patrilinear ancestor of Amadeo was his great-great-grandfather Cristobál Marco Martín, followed by Julián Marco Salboch and Amadeo's paternal grandfather Julián Ramón Marco Ezquer (1819-?). Owner of the family residence in Uztárroz, he emerged as a successful cattle breeder and head of the locally known familia corraliza. Marco Ezquer was married twice; his second wife was Vicenta Catalina Pérez Marco, descendant to another well-off Uztárroz family. They had at least 13 children; one of them was Amadeo's father, Pedro Nolasco Marco Pérez (1867–1913).

In 1895 Marco Pérez married Bruna Ilincheta Zalba (1869–1931), a girl from Navascués, a town in the neighboring Salazar Valley; she was daughter to a local merchant. The couple settled in Navascués. It is not clear what Marco Pérez did for a living; one source keeps referring to the family as to the cattle-breeders forming part of the Salazar/Roncal establishment, though other sources suggest he might have been operating a flour mill. Exact number of their children is unknown, though genealogical sources claim there were at least 6 siblings, most of them boys. Except Amadeo none of them became a public figure and some held only minor local positions, e.g. José Marco Ilincheta was a local Navascués Falange leader during early Francoism.

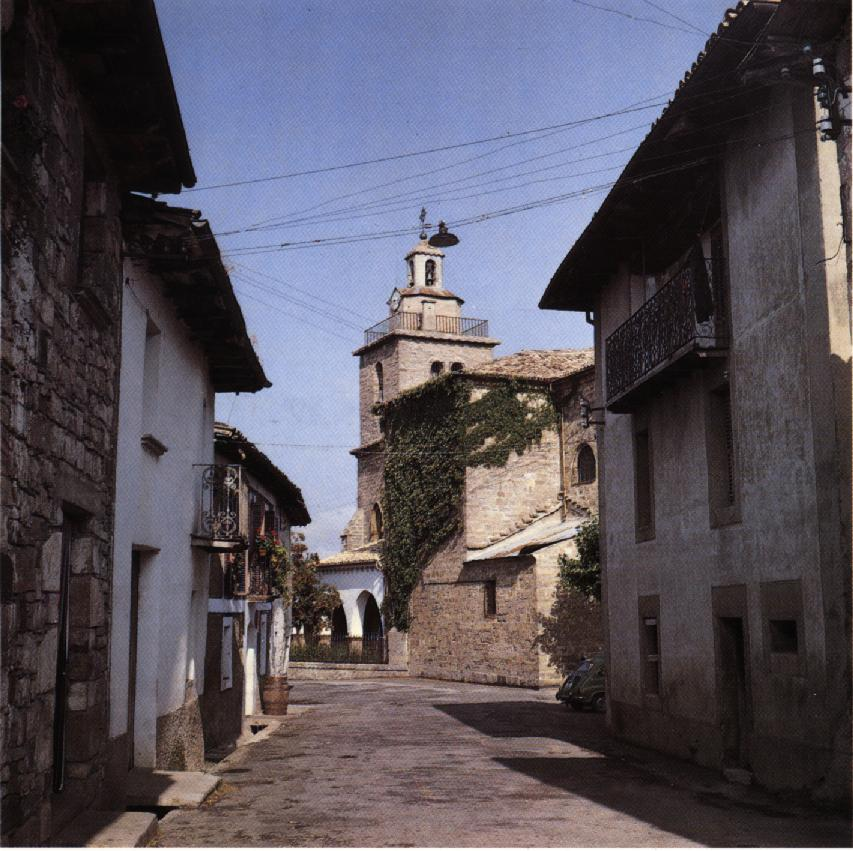
Navascués

Amadeo received his primary and secondary education in 1906–1916 in Zaragoza; he frequented a boarding school, run by the Piarists. Following bachillerato he enrolled in law at the University of Zaragoza. According to one source at unspecified time and for reasons which are not clear he later moved to Madrid and graduated in Universidad Central. Another source claims he graduated in Zaragoza as late as in 1931. He is reported to have also studied medicine and nautical sciences, but without completing his curriculum; he might have also been related to Instituto Provincial in Murcia. In the mid-1920s Marco was recorded back home, busy upgrading the Navascués flour mill business; he retained the family house in the town and lived there most of the time. By some sources he is referred to as “abogado y rentista” and in some ID documents his profession was also indicated as “abogado”, though there is no evidence he has ever practiced. Some historians discussing his activity in the early 1930s refer to him as to “propietario”. According to some sources he served in the merchant navy. He has never married and had no children; he was godfather of the 2020-2022 Carlist leader, Telmo Aldaz.

== Early political career (1927–1936) ==
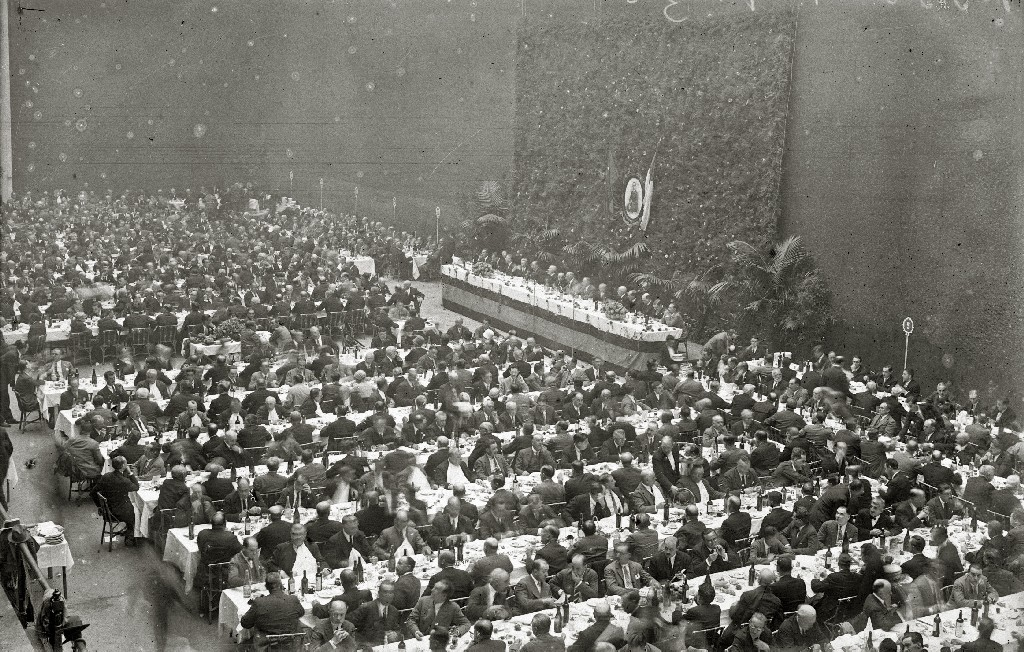
Unión Patriótica meeting, 1927

Political preferences of Marco's ancestors are unclear. On the one hand, related families on the paternal side, the Salboch, the Pérez, and the Amigot, have been linked to liberalism and some of their representatives distinguished themselves locally; the best known of them, the brother of Marco's grandmother Angel Pérez Marco (1828–1917), served as liberal deputy in the Navarrese diputación foral. On the other hand, his maternal grandfather nurtured Traditionalist sympathies. There is no data on preferences of Amadeo's parents, though it does not seem irrelevant that at least 4 of their sons volunteered later to the Carlist militia. Amadeo's political beginnings are obscure; the first information available is about his activity in the primoderiverista state party, Unión Patriótica, possibly in the mid-1920s. In 1927 he was nominated the mayor of Navascués. Circumstances of his rising to the relatively high position at such a young age are unclear; some authors attribute it to political influence of his family. Marco ceased as alcalde in 1929.

The fall of the monarchy and emergence of the republic in 1931 triggered nomination of new Diputación Foral, the Navarrese self-government. At the time Marco was already known as a right-winger; some sources refer to him generally as to “monarquico” and some specifically as to “Jaimista”. In spite of it, acting on the advice of the local comité republicano-socialista the new civil governor appointed him member of Diputación from Aoiz-Sangüesa, one of 5 Navarrese merindades represented in the body; he was also nominated the new Navascués alcalde and president of a local traditional body Junta de Veintena. Marco reportedly complained that these bodies should have been filled by means of elections and not by means of governmental nominations, nevertheless he accepted the appointments "por el bien de la Patria y por respeto al poder constituido". His rise is again attributed to the caciquismo culture and especially to the “long hand of his [liberalism-related] grandfather”, though other scholars suggest the family link in question is rather about the brother of his grandmother.

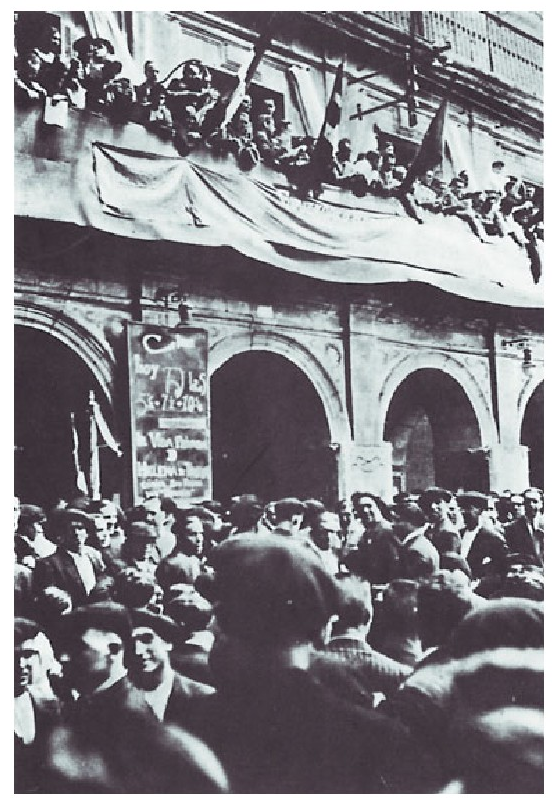
Estella statute rally, 1931

Marco's second term as alcalde and the first term as diputado foral is marked by debates on vasco-navarrese autonomy. He was skeptical about the secular nature of the original draft statute but backed its version amended during the rally of Navarrese alcaldes in Estella; in the Carlist press mouthpiece El Pensamiento Navarro he mobilized support from local town halls. In late 1931 Marco grew increasingly suspicious of the left-wing course adopted by the Diputación; in particular, he was enraged by its decision not to support financially the construction of a new seminary in Pamplona. Eventually, as a means of protest in December 1931 Marco resigned from the Navarrese self-government; his resignation was accepted in 1933. As alcalde he also first systematically ignored an official order to remove crucifixes from Navascués schools, and then in 1932 he violently opposed an attempt to enforce it. At the time he was already noted as member of Juventud Jaimista. It is not clear whether he continued as alcalde into the mid-1930s.

== Carlist climax and breakup (1936–1942) ==
Carlist standard

Until the outbreak of the Civil War Marco remained a local politician active in-between the county and the provincial level; his only episode related to national politics was the 1935 engagement in the buildup of Bloque de Derechas, a Navarrese coalition co-engineered by the Carlists with the right-wing minister of justice Rafael Aizpún. He took part in the anti-republican plot of early 1936. Within the conspiracy scheme he was a member of the Aoiz sub-division of Junta Central de Guerra de Navarra and jefé of requetés for Navascués and Valle de Salazar. Having received the order to rise from Utrilla he was initially engaged in the buildup of Carlist militia troops. Then he formed part of the command layer of Tercio Nuestra Señora de Camino, a battalion deployed first on the Northern Front, then in Teruel, and finally in Levante. Recognized for valiance, he was awarded numerous military decorations; in 1939 he finished the campaign as captain. According to some sources thanks to Marco, the anti-Republican repression produced no assassinations in Navascués.

In 1940 and on the advice of Rodezno Marco was nominated as representative of Aoiz-Sangüesa to the first Francoist Diputación Foral. The Navarrese Carlist executive was increasingly fragmented and split between 3 competing groups; the party nationwide leader Fal Conde appointed him to a 3-member task force entrusted with working out a solution. Marco travelled to Andalusia to discuss the way forward with Fal, at the time in house arrest in Seville. He was among short-listed candidates to lead the Navarrese Junta Regional and assumed command of the Navarrese requetés. However, he ruined his chances for regional jefatura when in 1941 he followed the official order to lower the Spanish flag half-mast after the death of Alfonso XIII. Moreover, following the outbreak of the Nazi-Soviet war he approached the German consulate in Pamplona and offered requeté support, the move immediately disauthorized by the Navarrese jefé Joaquín Baleztena. At the time he openly referred to Carlist executive as “órganos ya muertos en el partido”.

Falangist standard

Marco was fully compliant with unification of Carlism into the Francoist state party; when in 1941 Serrano Suñer decorated him with military awards he appeared in full FET gear, causing indignation of mainstream Carlists. In 1942 and in alignment with Arrese he advocated that Traditionalists adopt a collaborative stand and take seats in the Pamplona ayuntamiento; the new Navarrese party leader Jesús Elizalde considered it disloyal and suggested some disciplinary measures. When later in 1942 Marco was nominated secretario provincial of FET and then got appointed to the III Falangist Consejo Nacional, ranked #60 on the list of nominees, he did not seek approval of the Carlist executive. Eventually his pro-Falangist zeal, Germanophile drive and disregard for nationwide party command triggered reaction; in 1942 he was first stripped of his Navarrese requeté command and then expulsed from Comunión Tradicionalista. Though his re-admission was not ruled out, it was underlined that it would have to be approved by Junta Nacional.

== Early Francoism (1942–1954) ==
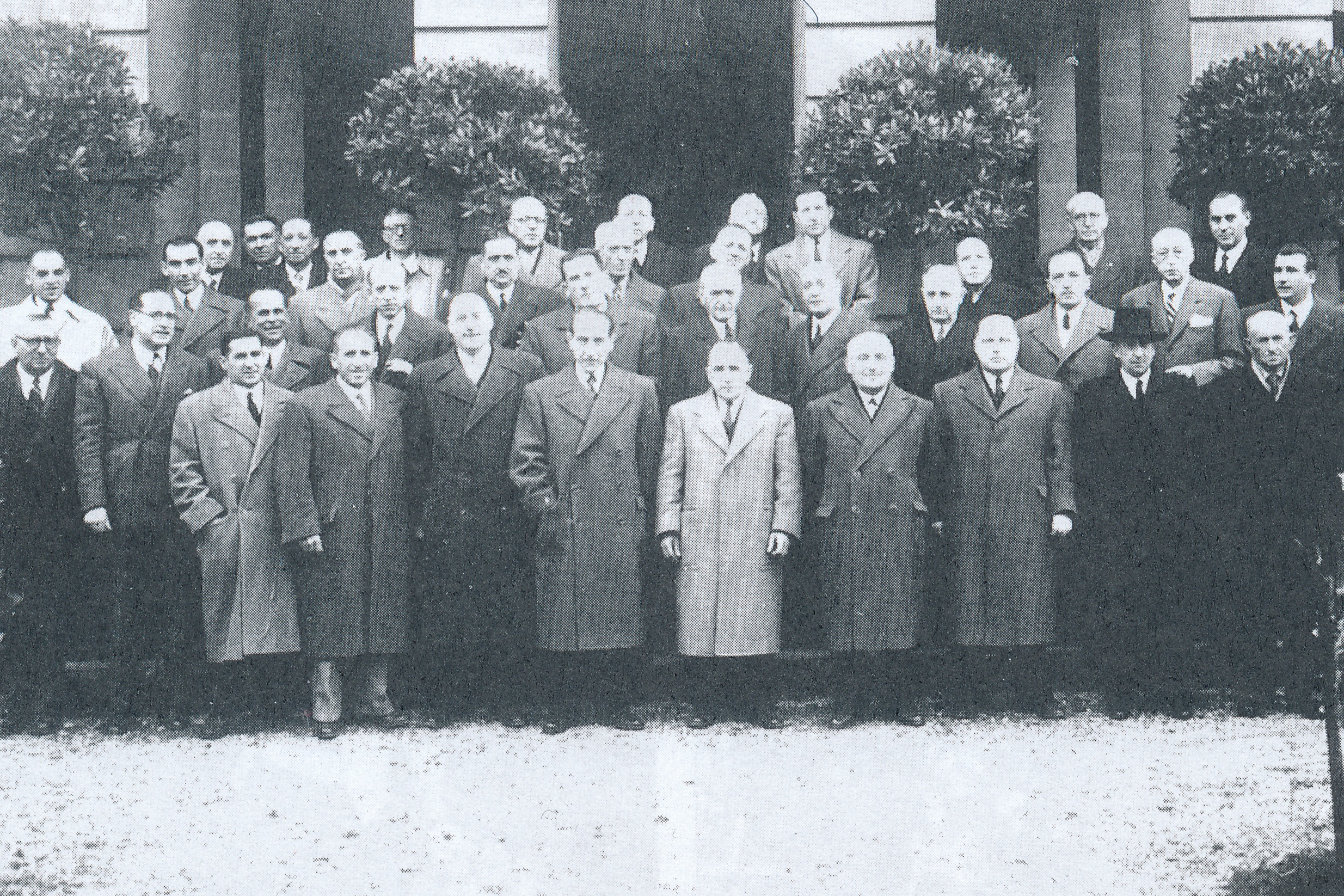
Marco in Consejo Foral Administrativo de Navarra, 1949

In the early 1940s Marco was the regime's “hombre fuerte” in Navarre, engineered most Francoist intrigues in the province and worked closely with the civil governor; officially his position was based on membership in Diputación Foral, in Falangist Consejo Nacional and deputy leadership of FET in Navarre. It was further enhanced in 1943, when because of his seat in Consejo he automatically entered Cortes Españolas, the new Francoist quasi-parliament. Also in 1943 Marco declared support for Karl Pius Habsburg, styled as the Traditionalist claimant Carlos VIII; the pretender led the breakaway Carlist faction of carloctavistas and with the permission of the regime, started to tour to country. Marco travelled to Andorra to speak to Karl Pius, and then in liaison with Arrese co-engineered his promotional campaign. Carlos VIII appointed him the Navarrese representative in Consejo Nacional of his organisation, Comunión Católico-Monárquica. He firmly opposed the mainstream falcondista branch, e.g. by discouraging requeté combatants from attending an anti-regime Pamplona rally of 1945 and then speaking against re-opening of their círculo, closed after the rally had turned into riots.

In the mid-1940s and with the official blessing of the military, Marco was appointed jefé of Navascués zone militia, deployed in anti-maquis operations. Initially his relation with the 1945-appointed civil governor Juan Junquera was excellent; both toured Navarre and Marco contributed with his expert knowledge about people and places. However, he soon concluded that Junquera advanced a centralist vision aimed against traditional separate Navarrese establishments, and the two developed mutual hostility. In 1948 Marco travelled to Madrid to denounce Junquera and to prove that genuinely attached to Franco, the region might get skeptical when stripped of its fueros. In late 1948 he resigned his position of sub-jefé of Movimiento in Navarre as means of protest against the governor's policy. Running on a firmly anti-Junquera ticket in 1949 Marco was re-elected to his second successive term in Diputación; despite his dissent, in 1949 he was also re-appointed to the FET Consejo Nacional.

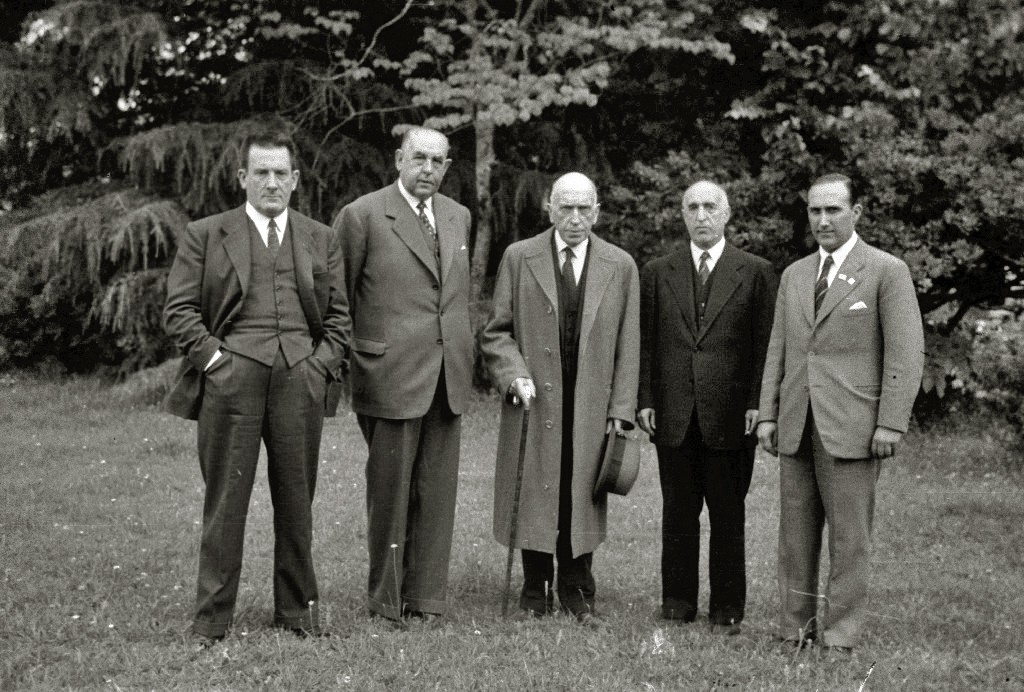
Marco (1fL) with Julio Urquijo (c) during his homage session, 1949

At the turn of the decades Marco made a U-turn and was seeking alliance of other Carlist currents against the new civil governor, Luis Valero; in 1950 he demanded re-opening of javierista círculos, though he might not have been entirely good-willed. He was. trying to build a common Traditionalist list in first local elections in 1948 and 1951; however, Fal Conde thought him a treacherous and untrustworthy man. In 1952 Marco was re-appointed to another term in Consejo Nacional, but Valero mounted a counter-action. He denounced Marco as a local boss disloyal to the Movement and in 1954 fired him from the Navascués alcaldia, held since 1949; shortly afterwards he lost seat in the Diputación. Moreover, by specific decree Marco was dismissed from Consejo Nacional, which resulted in his losing seat in the Cortes. The conflict erupted into public exchange of charges bordering insults; Marco demanded that Valero no longer calls him “dear friend”, declared that having friends like Valero would have been very unfortunate, and that by assailing him, Valero assails Navarre.

== Mid-Francoism (1954–1967) ==
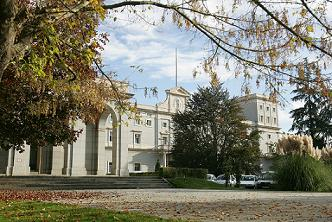
Universidad de Navarra

Valero's triumph in the Falangist-Carlist struggle for dominance in Navarre proved short-lived; he was soon dismissed, moved to a position in central administration. Marco fell out of provincial FET jefatura, from the FET Consejo Nacional and from the Cortes, but he regained his seat in Diputación Foral in 1955, comfortably elected from the district of Aoiz-Sangüesa and beating the Movimiento-supported counter-candidate. As it would turn out, he will be re-elected in 1961 with no rival standing. At the time he got detached from carloctavismo, as the claimant unexpectedly died and the movement disintegrated into almost non-existence; Marco represented rather sort of generic Francoism embodied in the strong, Navarre-attached personality, by enemies referred to as "eterno cacique navarrista". Always totally loyal to Franco, in the mid-1960s Marco again started to approach the Movimiento; when the Diputación president Felix Huarte denounced attempts to scrutinize candidates in forthcoming local elections in terms of their political stand as inadmissible, Marco co-engineered a letter of disagreement.

Most authors claim that during his term in the regional self-government Marco firmly opposed modernization of Navarre, pitted especially against any attempts at industrialization. He reportedly considered them a threat to local identity, fearing "pérdida de influencia del tradicionalismo católico, con un acendrado foralismo, la fuerte lealtad a Franco y un vasquismo cultural de tintes tradicionales". He was anxious to prevent depopulation of rural areas and urbanization, supposed to bring about massive cultural change. In 1963 he opposed the Opus Dei project of opening a university in Pamplona; in 1964 he voiced against "Plan de Promoción Industrial" and in 1965 against "Plan de Promoción Agrícola". He also worked to abolish Dirección General Técnica, a newly formed body entrusted with infrastructural development. However, he was president of Consejo de Patronos de las Facultades de la Universidad de Navarra, for years remained engaged in labors to build a highway crossing in Navarre and lobbied for a railway line, which via Alduides would connect Navarre with France and prevent economic stagnation of the region.

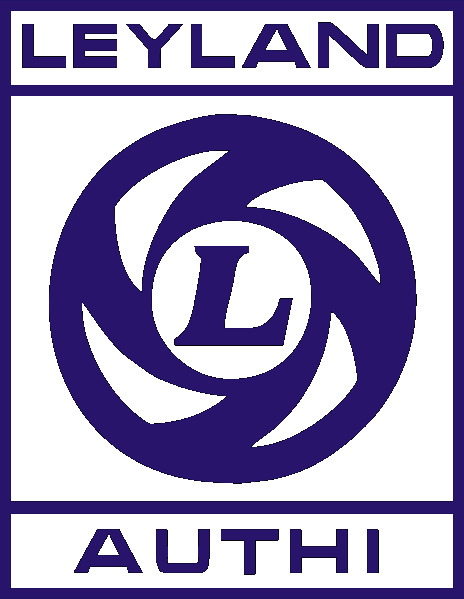
AUTHI logotype

During mid-Francoism Marco held some positions in business, mostly in executive boards of companies controlled or partially owned by Diputación Foral. The key of them was Caja de Ahorros de Navarra, the regional banking institution; as Caja was the key owner of OPPOSA, Organizacion De La Patata En El Pirineo Occidental Sociedad Agraria, Marco became its president. He was also president of Consejo Regional de Pamplona of El Hercules Hispano, an insurance company, co-owner of Gas Navarra, and co-founder of AUTHI, Sociedad Automóviles de Turismo Hispano-Ingleses. According to some authors, Marco took advantage of his position in Diputación and generously assisted some of these private entities with public money, e.g. by granting tax exemptions, donating communal property and straightforward financial aid; by some he is considered a typical example of the corrupted “fauna franquista”, though other scholars claim that during his public service Marco retained total integrity, did not enrich himself either duly or unduly, and lived Spartan life which would later border poverty.

== Late Francoism (1967–1975) ==
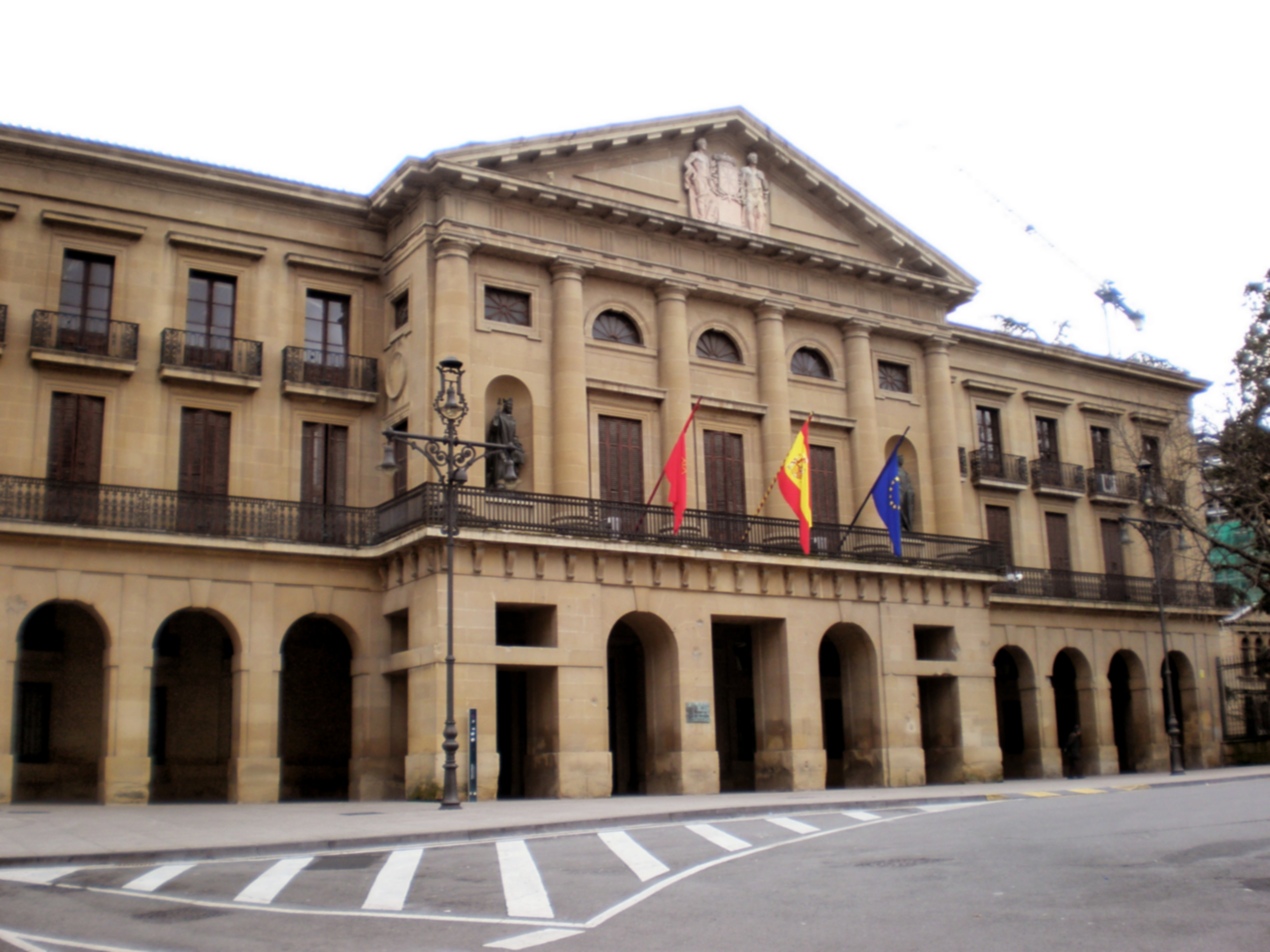
Diputación Foral site, Pamplona

Following 12 years of absence in Cortes Españolas, in 1967 Marco regained his ticket to the Francoist quasi-parliament; unlike the previous 4 terms he did not take the seat reserved for Consejeros Nacionales, but gained his ticket in the pool reserved for Representantes de Diputaciones Provinciales y Mancomunidades. He was a member of Comisión de Defensa. In the 1967 elections to Diputación Foral Marco as usual stood in the district of Aoiz-Sangüesa; unlike in 1961 he faced a rival, a technocratic opponent. He again emerged victorious, though in the self-government he remained in minority; the body was dominated by the desarrollista group headed by the Diputación vice-president Felix Huarte. The balance of power changed in 1971, when Huarte died. As a provisional measure until the end of the term Marco, who was the oldest member of the chamber, was appointed its acting vice-president; according to some scholars at this point "sector tradicionalista" regained control over the body and started to reverse some of the changes instituted earlier. Also in 1971 Marco got his Cortes mandate prolonged for another term, again as representative of local self-governmental institutions; out of 6 Navarrese electors, 5 voted in his favor. Progressist hopefuls running in so-called tercio familiar and related to Partido Carlista filed a lawsuit against him, pointing to disallowed intervention in favor of some candidates running from the pool, but there was no follow-up.

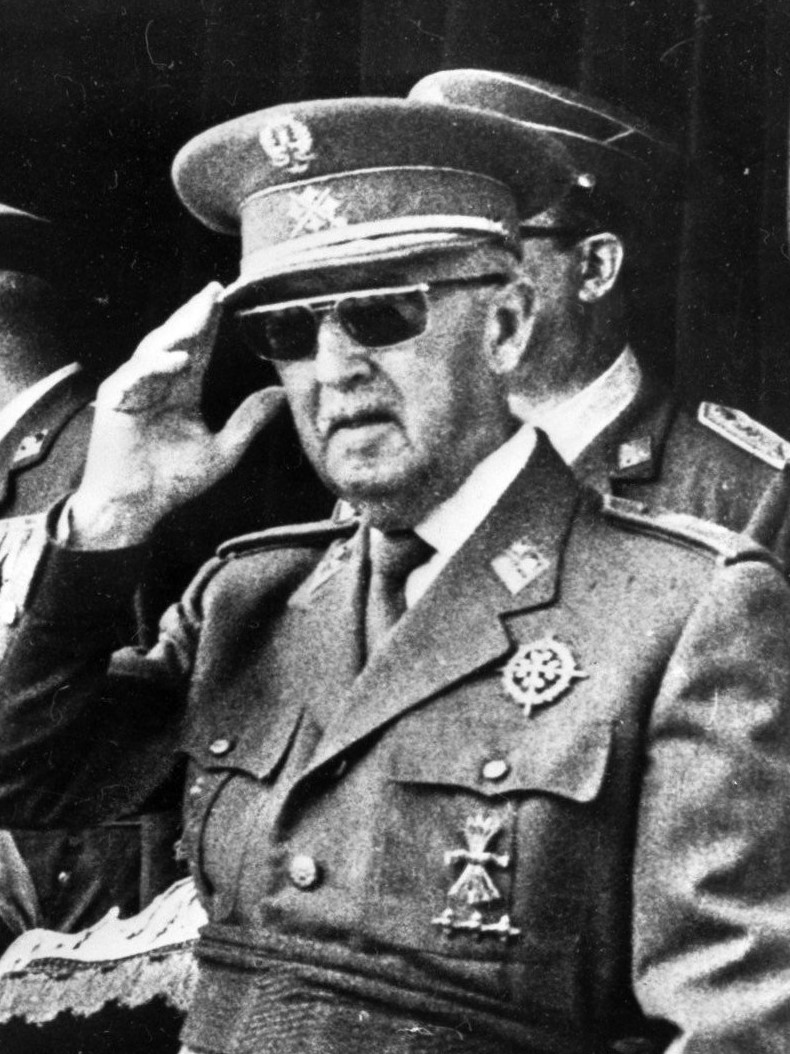
Franco, 1970s

In the early 1970s Marco as acting president of Diputación was involved in daily routines, like works on infrastructure buildup in the province. As a vascophile he supported the setup of Patronato de Fomento del Vascuense and became its president, a follow-up of his earlier co-initiative of setting up Basque ikastolas and other initiatives. However, he had to deal with other manifestations of the Basque issue and other new political phenomena. He vehemently lambasted as cowardice the ETA attempts against individuals and buildings; it was later revealed that the Basque terrorist organisation was considering his assassination. He also spoke against Pamplona strikes following the MATESA scandal, in careful wording denouncing disturbances which reportedly posed a threat to labor conditions and the local economy. In 1973, Marco-led Diputación was in corpore admitted by Franco, expressing gratitude for Franco's sympathetic position. In 1974 he was for the 6th consecutive time elected to Diputación and assumed the duties of its vice-president. In the Cortes Marco entered its Comisión Permanente, a committee acting on Cortes’ behalf when the body was off-session. His ascendance was purely ceremonial and fairly automatic, conditioned by his age; at the time he was already one of the oldest members of the chamber. Shortly before the death of the dictator, in Navarre Marco was sort of an iconic Francoist patriarch, by some considered the exemplary local cacique of the regime.

== Transición (1975–1979) ==
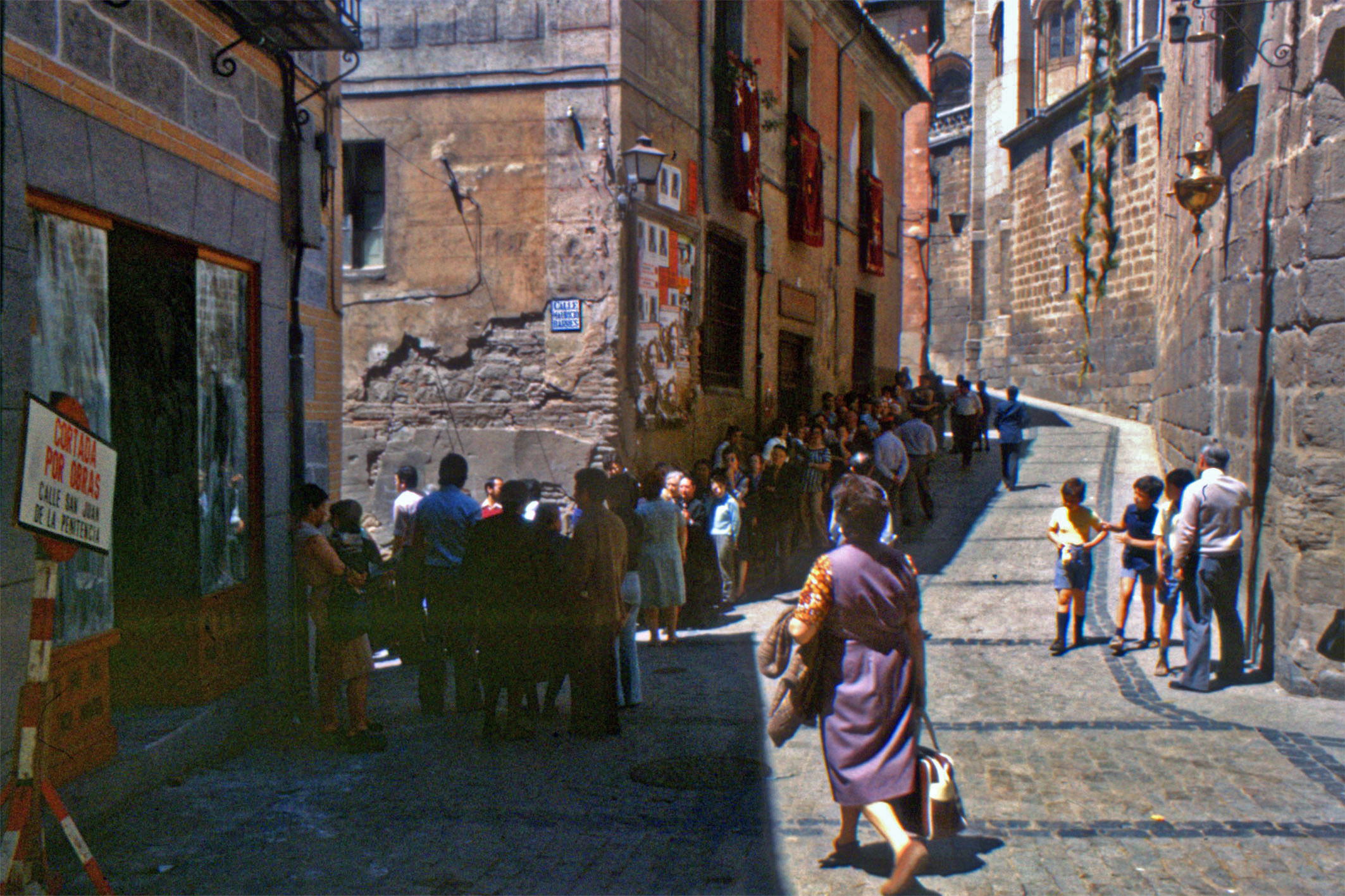
general elections, 1977

Following the 1976 Montejurra shootout the self-governmental statement condemned violence and declared it should never happen again. Few months later Marco successfully opposed the motion aimed at democratisation of the regional regime. In the Cortes he remained inactive and was mostly witness to the debate on Ley para la Reforma Política; during the final vote on November 18, 1976, he decided to support the project, thus opening the way for further reform; some name the act as "suicide of the Francoist Cortes". Afterwards and in the name of the Diputación he sent a congratulations message to the prime minister Adolfo Suárez. In early 1977 Marco was among co-founders of Alianza Foral Navarra, a right-wing party focused on Navarrese identity by some scholars categorized as the post-Francoist “bunker”, and became its president. The organisation demanded restoration of traditional Navarrese establishments and sponsored similar declarations of the Diputación, against a competitive project favored by UCD; during general elections AFN garnered 8,5% of the votes in Navarre and was the 4th political force in the province.

In 1977 AFN and Marco personally turned most vehement opponents of the plan to merge Navarre and Vascongadas into one autonomous community, already discussed between the Madrid government and the Basque politicians. Alianza staged a massive propaganda campaign against the project. ETA planned 2 attempts against Marco, numerous acts of progressist and Nationalist violence against AFN followed, and the left-wing press staged a vehement propaganda onslaught; they counted him among “notorios fascistas” and charged him with using Diputación for sectarian party purposes. The anti-merger campaign climaxed in a grand rally in Pamplona in December 1977; Marco emerged among the key speakers and lambasted the would-be merger as "suicide" of Navarre. Eventually the plan was abandoned and scaled down to a possibility, subject to approval in a referendum. Historians claim that Marco's role was fundamental and that he was among key actors who prevented the Basque-Navarrese merger.

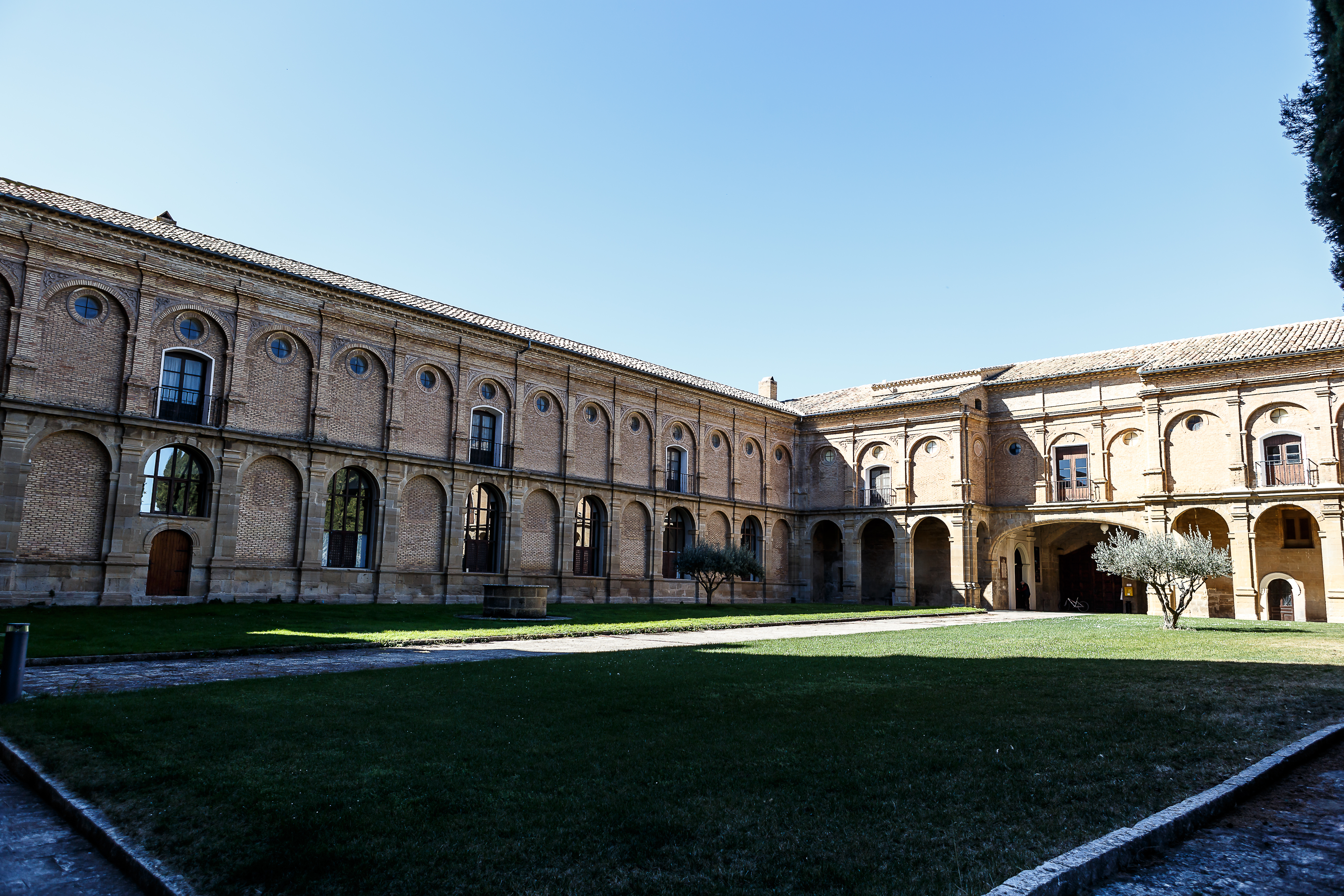
Monasterio de Oliva

In 1978 Diputación agreed with the Madrid government that the civil governor would no longer be president of the body; it was Marco that agreed to become the acting president. In this capacity he led the talks with central authorities on the exact shape of the Navarrese regime and demonstrated an intransigent stand, focused on restoration of the 19th-century Ley Paccionada. He was not supported by more tractable UCD; progressist press ridiculed him. Eventually Marco was offered minor concessions which allowed his “honrosa capitulación” and which opened the path towards Real Decreto Paccionado of January 26, 1979; also in 1979 he signed the agreement on the Navarrese electoral regime and numerous other arrangements. In 1979 Marco withdrew from politics and resigned from all posts held. He moved into Monasterio de Oliva and led the life of a monk. In one of rare interviews he admitted Traditionalist identity and sympathy for Juan Carlos. Shortly before death he returned to his home in Navascués, where he lived embittered alone with his dog. His financial status was shaky; some accounts note austerity bordering poverty.

== Reception and legacy ==
Navarrese standard

Amadeo Marco has never become a nationally recognized figure; however, in Navarre he emerged as one of the key personalities shaping the political regime in the region for almost 40 years. Until the 1940s he was known merely in the Aoiz-Sangüesa district and within Carlism; initially hailed as brave requeté, within the movement he was later considered a disloyal agent of Francoism. As decades passed and Marco got his Diputación ticket renewed time after time, he gradually became the key political personality in the region. Apart from numerous decorations awarded by the regime, he was declared hijo predilecto by Navascués, presidente perpetuo of Aspurz, hijo adoptivo of Uztárroz, Bigüezal, Javier and Castillonuevo, presidente honorario of Junta General del Valle de Salazar and alcalde mayor and hijo adoptivo of the valley. In 1977 he was awarded the Mexican Aquila Azteca order and in 1978 he was honored by Gran Cruz de la Orden Militar. The Navarrese Diputación attended his funeral in corpore.

Since the 1970s Marco has been generating much controversy. The progressist and Basque nationalist authors present him as a local Francoist boss who during an exceptionally long tenure developed his own clientelistic network and hugely contributed to the buildup and tight grip of the regime in the region. He is dubbed "caso paradigmático" for bossism and "eterno cacique navarrista". It is suggested that he took personal advantage of his longtime position in Diputación, which resulted in personal gain for him and his family. His anti-democratic outlook is undisputable; some categorize him as “a fascist” and also the right-wing authors agree that in the late 1970s he considered the ongoing change a temporary shift and anticipated that democratization would turn into an episode. At times he appears in present-day political debates as a point of reference, standing for a sectarian right-wing fanaticism; he is denied Basque credentials and ridiculed as a false vascophile. British anthropologist depicts Marco as iconic ultra-right “bunker” representative.

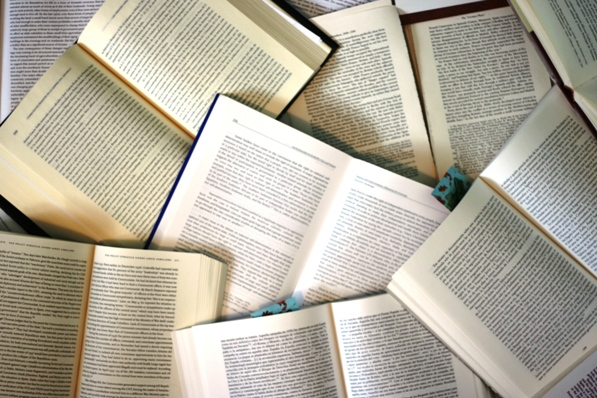

Within navarrismo Marco is held in high esteem; he is presented as the politician who systematically defended the traditional Navarrese political identity. According to this reading, Marco confronted the centralizing Francoist regime and tried to find a “third way”; later he provided a crucial contribution when preventing the takeover of Navarre by the militant Basque nationalism. Marco's position is portrayed not as fanaticism, but rather as a case of “pragmatismo navarro”, also when it comes to cultivating the Basque culture. Reportedly sensitive to social issues, he nevertheless steered clear of trappings of socialism. Charges of financial misdeeds are rejected by authors who note that Marco spent his last years bordering destitution in an old, dilapidating family house in Navascués. The hagiographic version of Marco's political career is presented in the only monograph by Francisco Javier Asín Semberoiz. Academic historians present him as the one who headed the traditionalist faction against the technocratic one, lost, and saw most of his idealized narrative taken over by Basque nationalism. To some he remains a paradoxical figure.

== See also ==
- Traditionalism (Spain)
- Carlo-francoism
- Carlism
- Carloctavismo
