= Sierra de Leyre =

Mountain range in Navarre, Spain

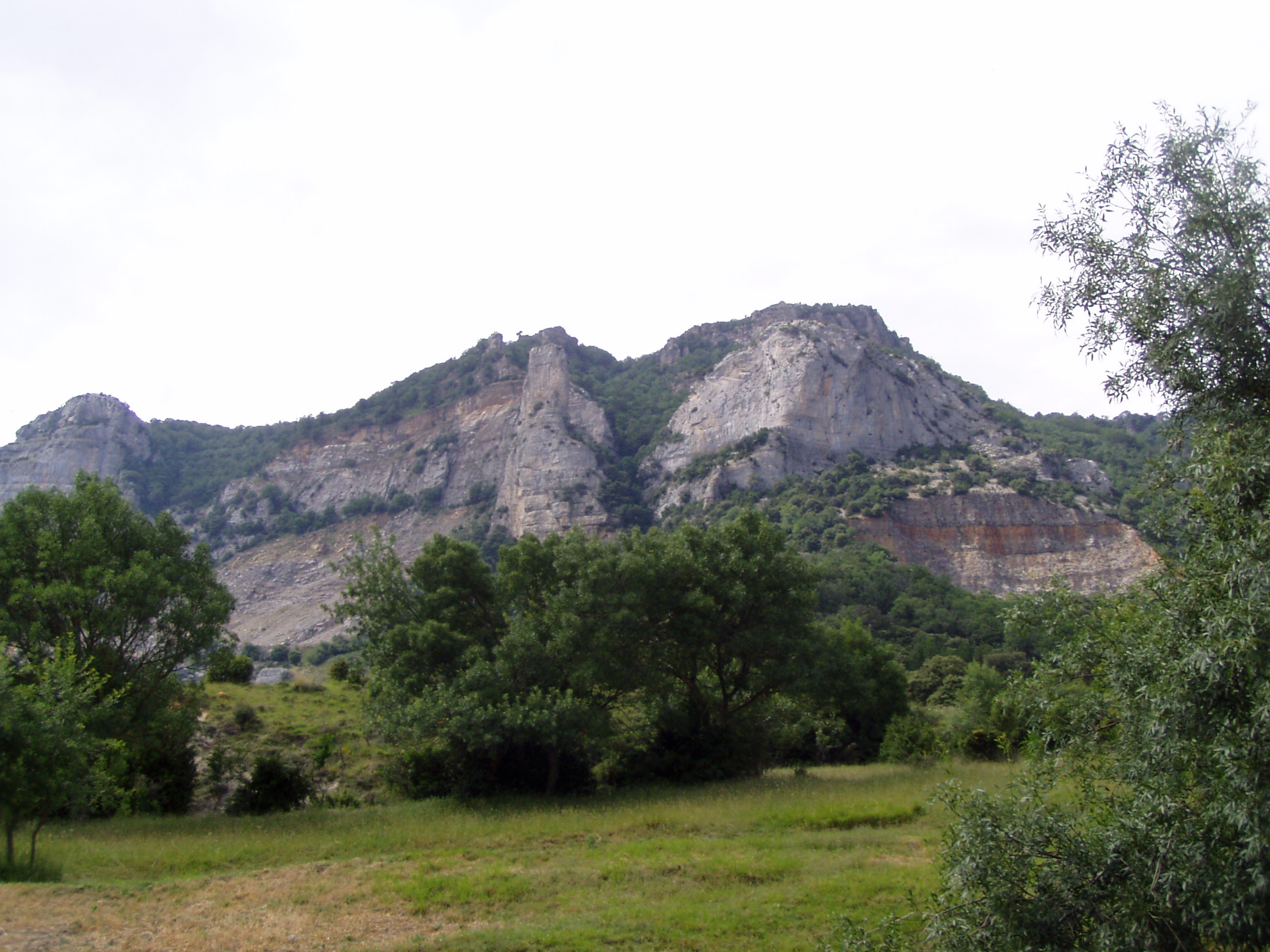

Highest point
- Elevation: 1,353 m (4,439 ft)
- Coordinates: 42°38′51″N 1°09′00″W

Dimensions
- Length: 30 km (19 mi)

Geography
- Location: Spain, Aragon, Navarra

The Sierra de Leyre or Sierra de Leire (Note: "In Spanish, the /i/ is written "y" when, being unstressed, it is in word final position preceded by a vowel with which it forms a diphthong ("rey, ay, fray, ley, hoy"). Inside a word, the phoneme /i/ is represented by the letter "i": "reina, fraile"". RAE on Twitter, February 18, 2020. (In Spanish).) (Basque: Leyreren Mendilerroa) is a mountain range in Navarre (Spain). It is the first pre-Pyrenean mountain range and is located in the northeast of the Comunidad Foral. It is 30 km long and has an east–west orientation.

It rises above the valley of the Aragón river, above the Berdún channel that collects the waters of the Yesa reservoir. Its most important peaks are Escalar (1302 m.a.s.l.) and Arangoiti (1353 m.a.s.l.) Another notable geographical feature is the Foz de Lumbier, a deep and narrow foz through which the waters of the Irati river flow once it has joined the waters of the Salazar.

On the slopes of Arangoiti is the monastery of Leyre, one of the most important Romanesque monasteries in Navarre, dating from the 8th century, and at the western end is the hermitage of La Trinidad.

Together with the mountain ranges of Urbasa, Andía, Perdón, Alaiz and Izco, it forms a geomorphological and climatic border between Atlantic and Alpine Navarre on the one hand, and Mediterranean Navarre on the other.

The range forms a corridor between Navarre and Aragon, a historical passage used by those who have passed from one kingdom to the other. The Camino de Santiago passes through it, following the Toulouse variant, crossing the Pyrenees at Jaca. The valleys that give access to the Pyrenean mountains, in which the pine has been exploited since ancient times, were formed around the rivers that served as a means of communication and extraction of the wood, which represented the wealth for the community settled in them. These rivers were crossed by the "navateros" or "almadieros" who transported the large logs to the places designated for their transport by land. The construction of the reservoirs, such as Yesa, put an end to this type of transport.

At their feet runs the Cañada Real de los Roncaleses (GR-13), which was the route used by the shepherds of the Roncal Valley and Salazar valley, co-users of the Bardenas Reales, to take their flocks to winter in there. This path starts at the Laza pass, between the Roncal and Salazar valleys, and reaches the hermitage of the Virgen del Yugo, in Arguedas, in the middle of the Bardena, and coincides with the GR-13 long-distance route.

== Geological composition ==
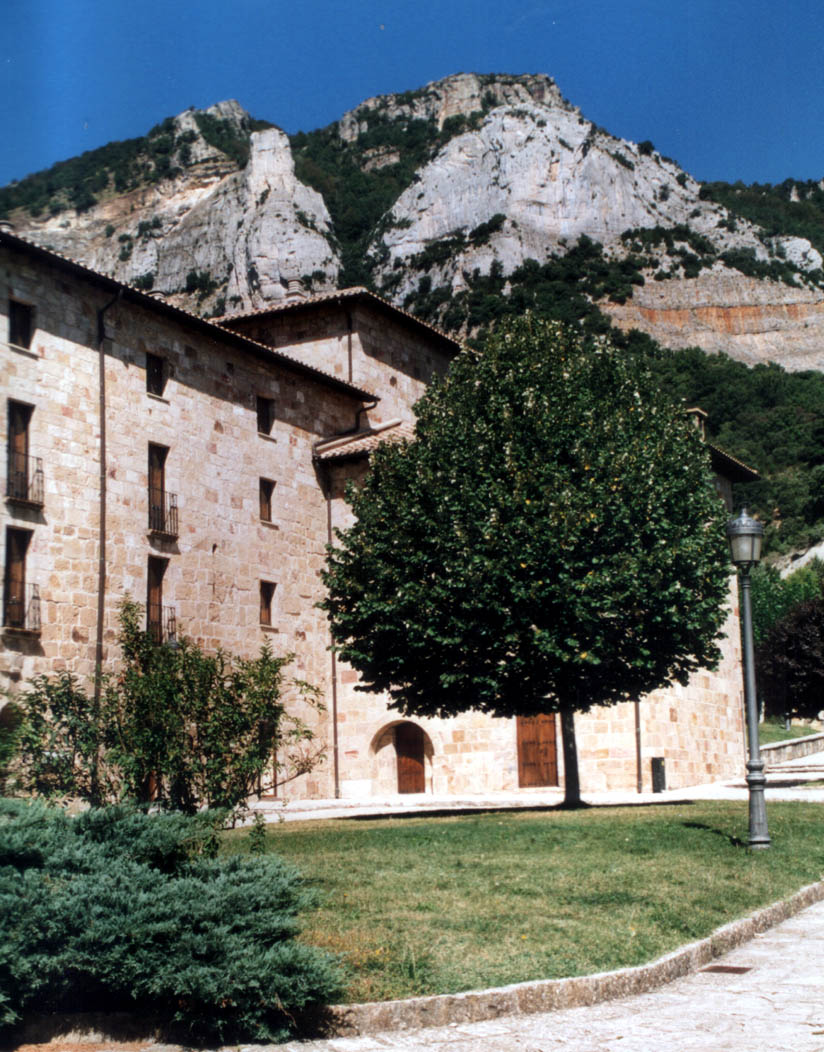
Monastery of Leire

The extensive basin between the Ebro depression and the Pyrenees, composed of deposits from the secondary and tertiary periods of marine origin, has in the mountains that make up the Sierra de Leyre an important and relevant geographical and structural feature.

The range runs in an east–west direction, and consists of two parallel alignments, in whose central depression Bigüezal and Castillonuevo are located; in its northern foothills it forms the Sierra de Illón, with its maximum height in the Borreguil (1420 m.a.s.l.), and the Sierra de Idocorry. Three rivers, the Esca, the Salazar and the Irati, cross the mountain chains forming very abrupt valleys, which are known by the name of foz, and which from a landscape and natural point of view are of great importance. The ones that are formed are the Foz of Burgui, Arbayún, Aspurz and Lumbier.

The soils are formed by limestones and dolomites, these very sandy, belonging to the Late Cretaceous, together with dolomites and limestones of the Paleocene, and calcarenites with alveolites and nummulites of the Eocene. There are flysch structures folded and dipping in a southerly direction that, on occasions, become faulted. The limestones, being sandy, do not lend themselves to karstic development. Phenomena of this type coincide with faults.

This area is affected by Pyrenean tectonics with structures of little thickness and plasticity. The limestones are the ones that form the core of the structure and resist erosion. The main anticline is located to the south, to the east a series of more complicated anticlines are formed that become faulted and thrusting.

Morphologically, the Foz de Arbayún and the cliff that opens on the Berdún channel are very relevant, as well as the abrupt end of the mountain range on the south side. This side of the range has two distinct parts, the lower one, with a 600 m slope, descends to the Aragón riverbed and is composed of magnas and the upper one, composed of sandy limestone, has a slope of 300 m.

=== Foz de Arbayún ===
This spectacular cut that the Salazar River makes in the rock has a length of 6 km and a maximum depth of 385 m. In 1975, ICONA included it in the National Inventory of Outstanding Landscapes. Its walls are vertical and with a lot of vegetation with great variety and floristic richness. It is an important ornithological area where the most important colony of common vultures in the Pyrenees is located. Its fauna also includes the golden eagle, Egyptian vulture, peregrine falcon, Bonelli's eagle, stock dove, choughs, eagle owl, crag martin, alpine swift, etc. and among the mammals the wild boar, fox, badger, fuina, wild cat, genet and weasel, and more scarce but present, otters and roe deer.

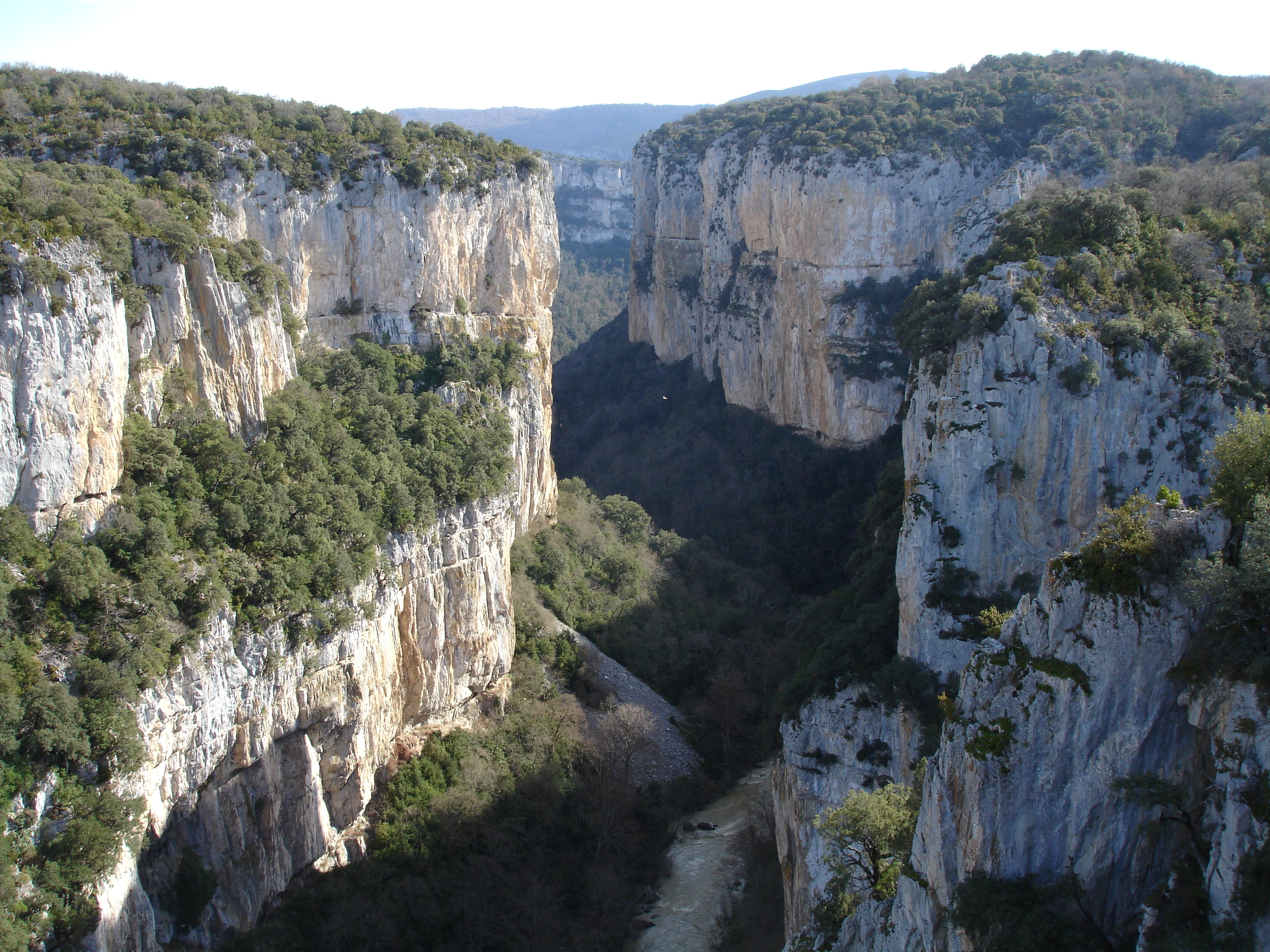
Foz de Arbayún from the viewpoint on the road.

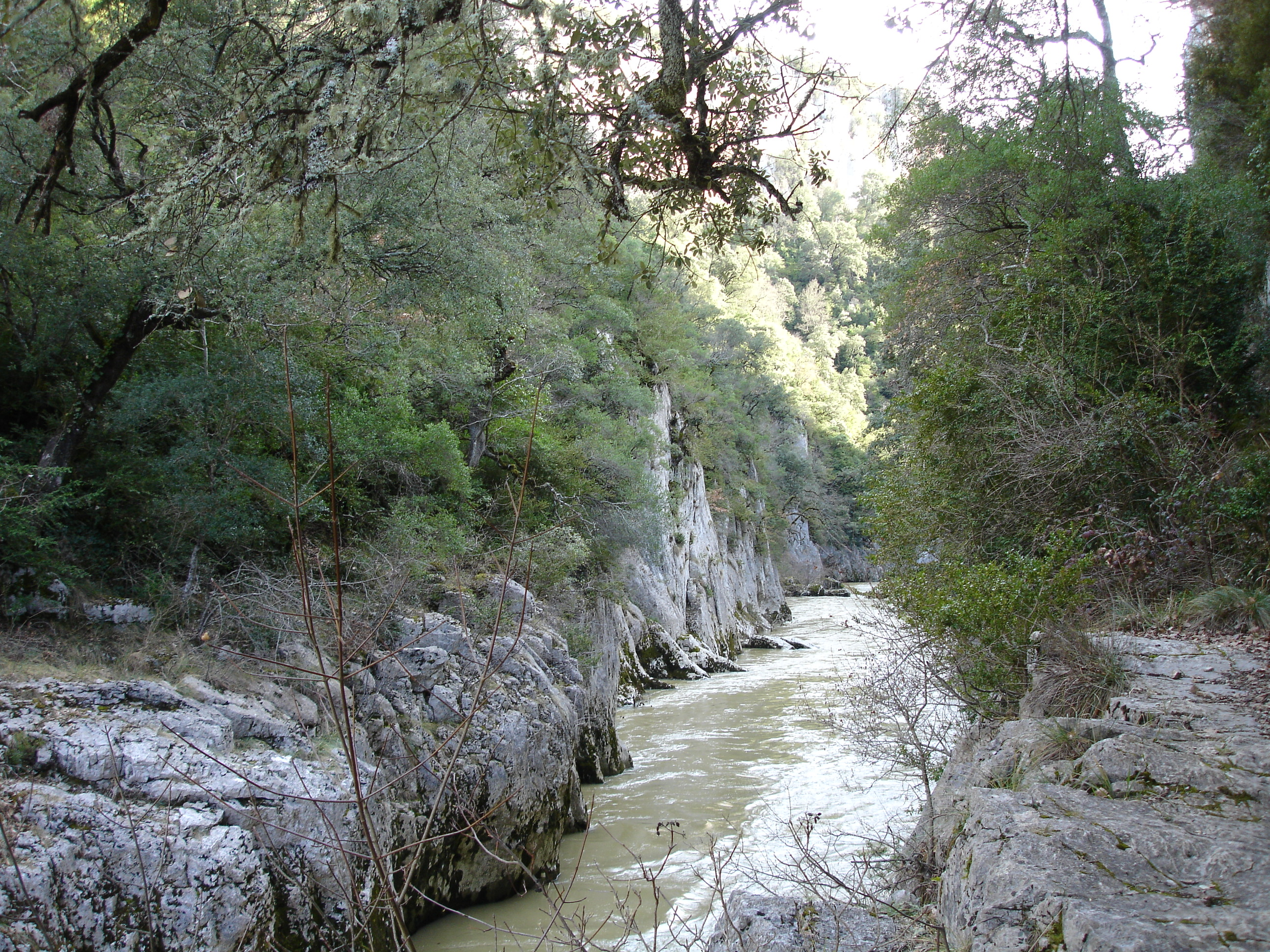
Salazar River

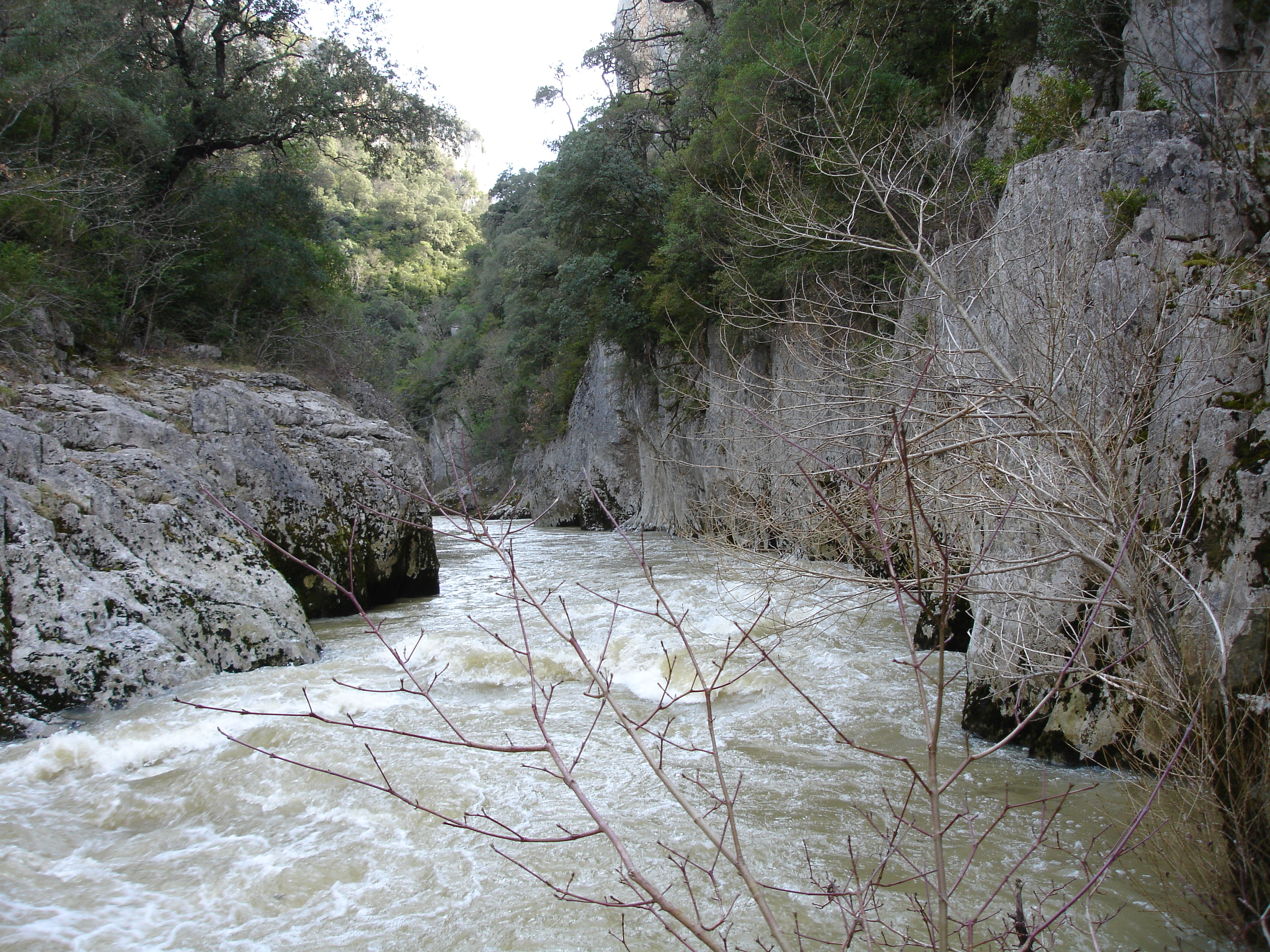
Salazar River

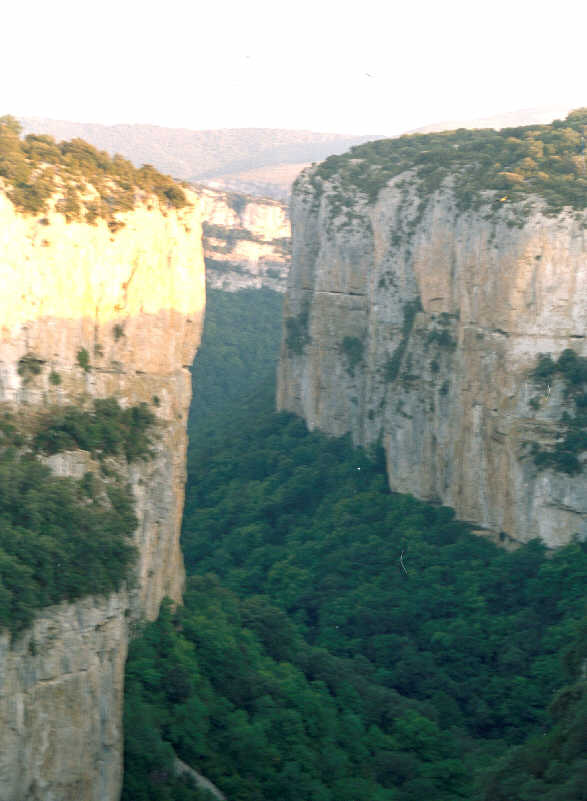
Foz de Arbayún from the viewpoint on the road from Lumbier to Navascués.

=== Foz de Lumbier ===
With just over a kilometer long and a 120-meter drop from the Irati River, this steep pass of vertical walls contains one of the most important nesting areas in Navarra, protected as a Natural Reserve. Vultures, red-billed choughs, Egyptian vultures, king martins, jackdaws, solitary rock thrushes, rock thrushes and rock pigeons abound. The vegetation is made up of holm oaks, junipers, boxwoods and ivy that arise from the different seats of the walls.

The railroad from Pamplona to Sangüesa crossed this place by means of two tunnels. When the railway service disappeared, the track was converted into a trail.

== Flora and fauna ==
=== Flora ===
The proximity of the mountain range to the Pyrenees and its belonging to the Mediterranean basin makes it the limit between both systems. In its forests there are abundant species such as beech and Scotch pine as well as the Pyrenean fir, the forest of this species located in the ravine of Basari in Burgui is the southernmost of the Iberian Peninsula.

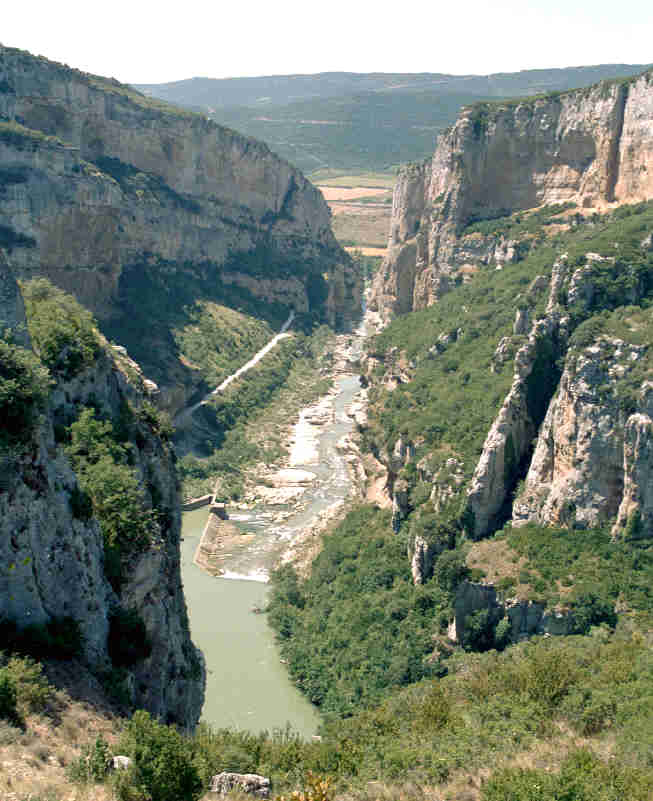
Foz de Lumbier.

In the interior of the foces a very rich and diverse riparian forest is formed. It abounds in linden, ash, maple, rowan, hazel and elm trees. On the shelves that form on the walls of the foces inhabit some relevant species because of their endemic character or their extreme biogeographic position, some of them are Saxifraga longifolia, Sarcocapnos enneaphylla, Saponaria glutinosa and Petrocoptis hispanica. On the southern slopes there is an abundance of holm oak, oak, kermes oak and gall oak groves, while the northern slopes are covered with Scots pine and some remains of beech trees which have replaced the gall oak groves, this expansion has been spurred by the profitability that pine trees produce for the inhabitants of the villages in the area.

=== Fauna ===
In the Sierra de Leyre there are characteristics that help the avian richness to be important. The abrupt foces allow many birds of prey to nest on their walls. The Foz de Arbayún is home to the largest colony of griffon vultures in Navarre and the second largest in the Iberian Peninsula in terms of the number of nesting pairs. Along with the vultures, Egyptian vultures, bearded vultures (Gypaetus barbatus), eagles have also been recorded. In other foces, such as Lumbier, there is evidence of the existence of eagle owls, red-billed choughs and peregrine falcons, and golden eagles can also be seen. In the rivers, otters can be seen without difficulty.

=== Protected areas ===
In the Sierra de Leyre there is a total protected area of 1359 ha divided into three different zones corresponding to three foces. This protection is carried out in the main river gorges where the most important nesting areas are located. These are the following:

- Foz de Lumbier with 40 ha protected.
- Foz de Arbayún with 1164 ha protected.
- Foz de Burgui with 155 ha protected.

There is no protection for the entire range, although there are plans to create a natural park covering an area of more than 40,000 ha.

== Touristic resources ==
In the range itself and its surroundings there are unique and important religious, civil and military monuments. In the range itself is located the Monastery of Leyre that has the most relevant construction of the Navarrese Romanesque and royal pantheon of the kings of the Pamplona Najera kingdom, nearby, already in Zaragoza, is the monastery of San Juan de la Peña also Romanesque and royal pantheon of the kings of Aragon, within its walls was kept the Holy Grail for a long time, according to legend. The Castle of Xavier was the birthplace in 1500 of Francis Xavier, co-founder, together with Ignatius of Loyola, of the Society of Jesus. Sangüesa, capital of this region, has an important monumental heritage and a few kilometers away is the birthplace of Ferdinand the Catholic, Sos del Rey Católico, King of Aragón and co-author, together with his wife Isabella the Catholic, of the unity between the kingdoms of Castile and Aragón*.

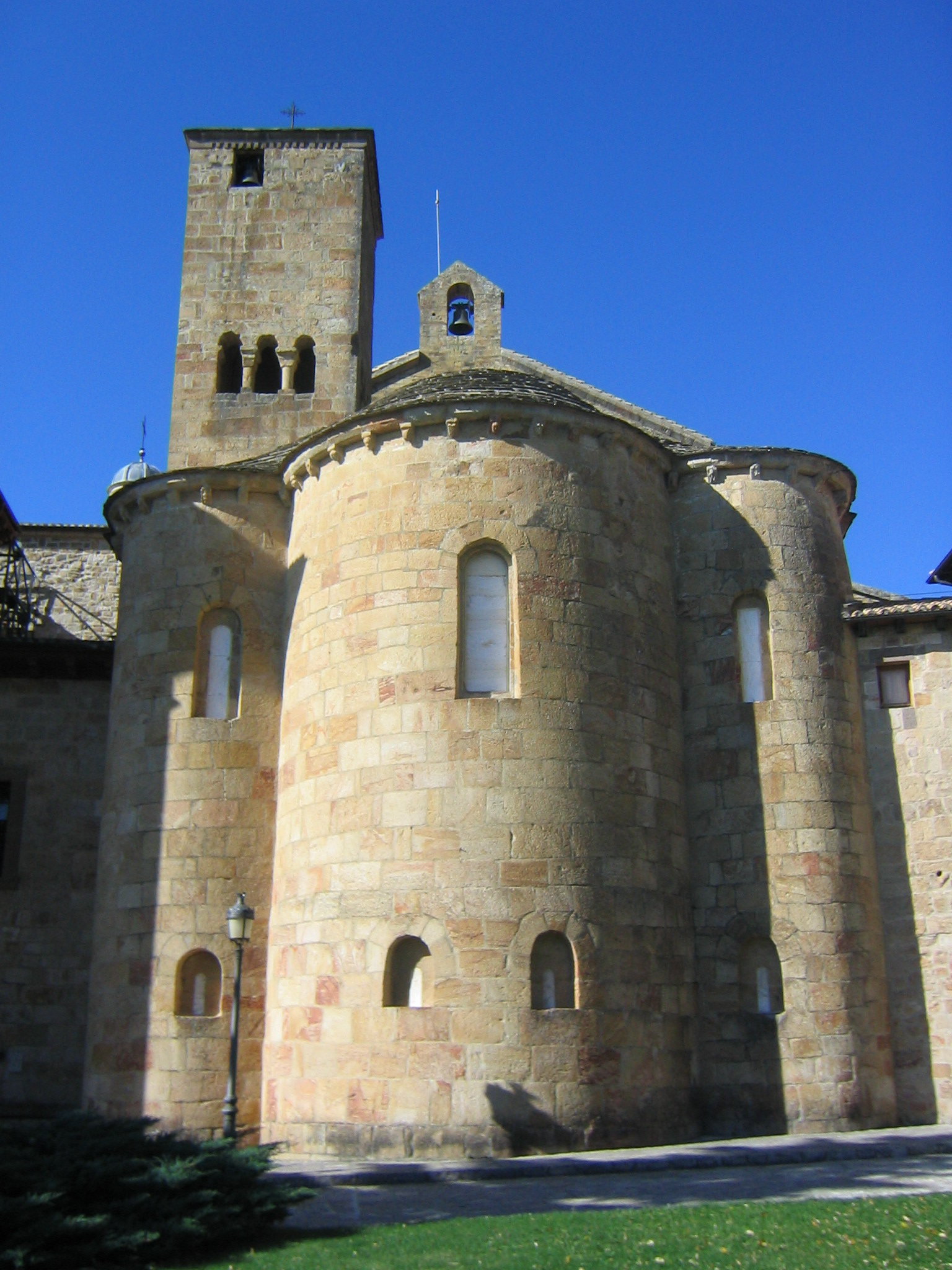
Monastery of Leyre, apse and tower.

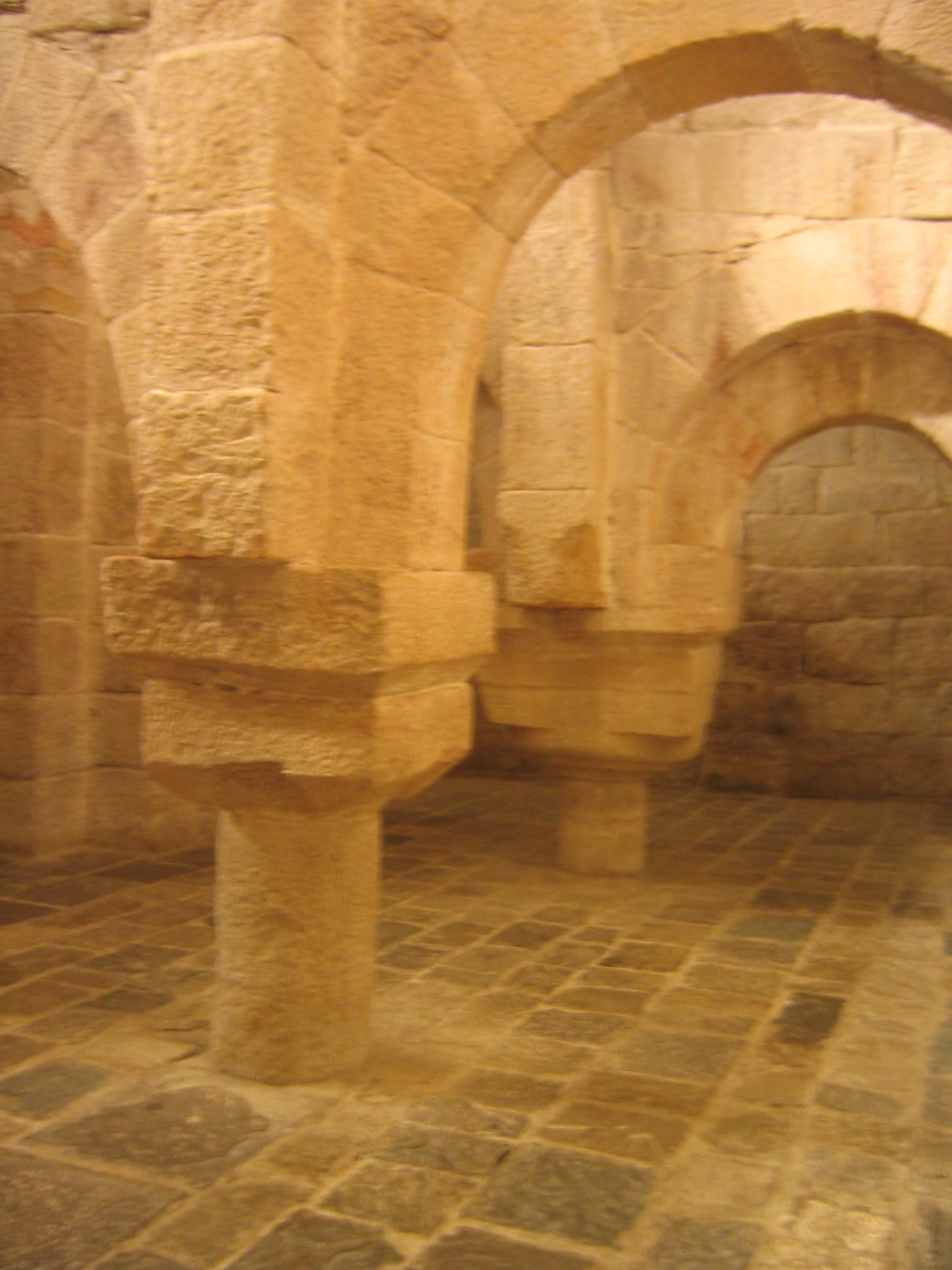
Monastery of Leyre, crypt.

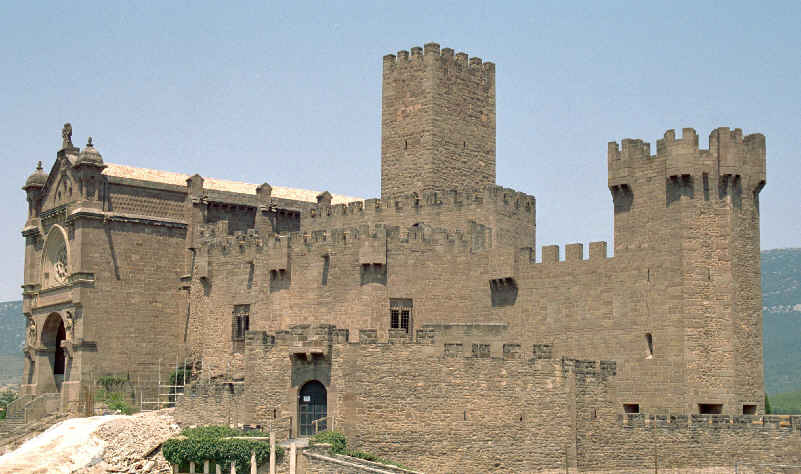
Castle of Javier.

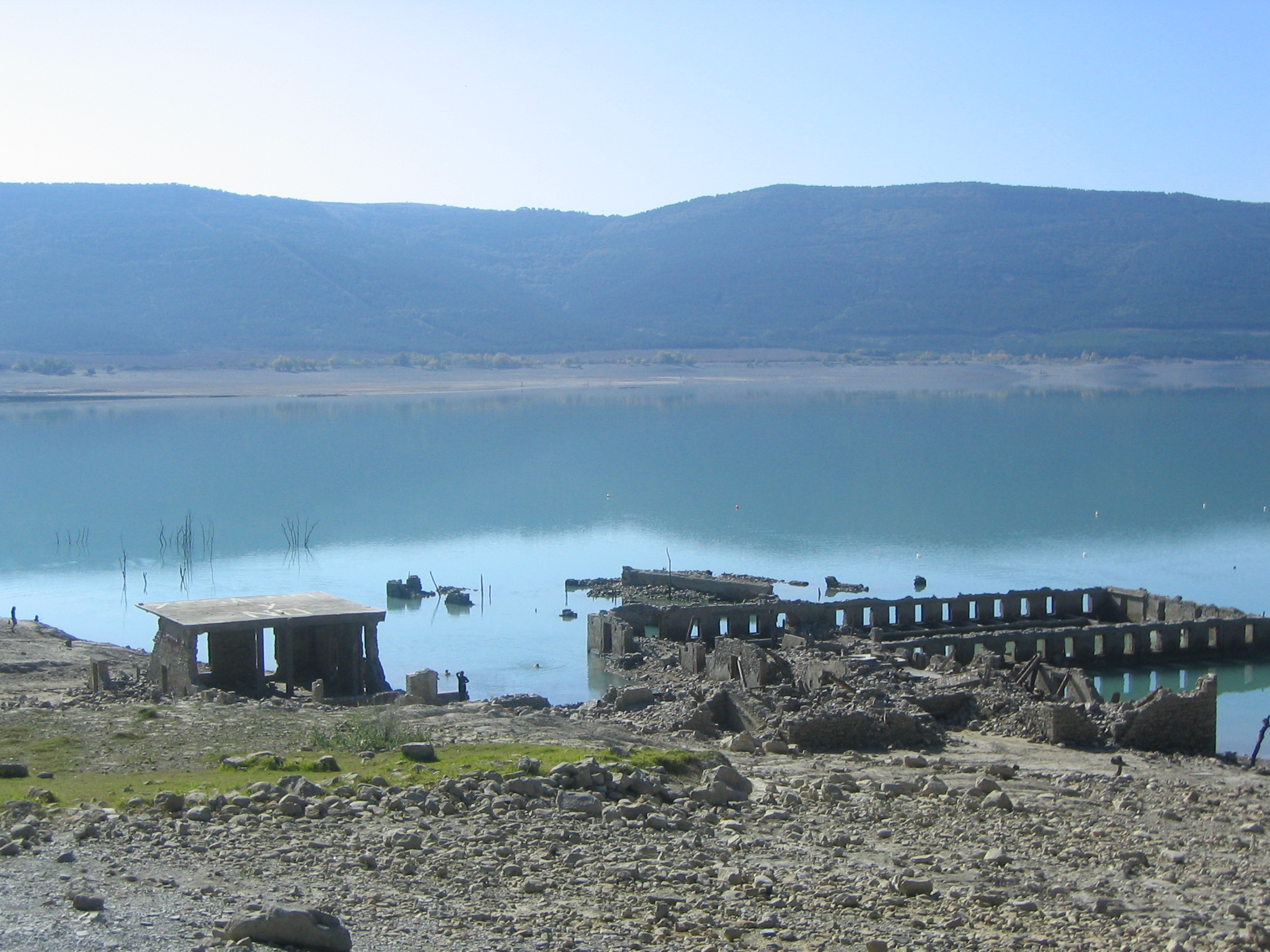
Partial view of Yesa reservoir. In the foreground, the flooded area of the Tiermas Hot Springs Spa.

The natural wealth is described with the range, where you can make several significant routes such as the ascent to the Castellar from the monastery of Leyre. The Yesa reservoir, known as the sea of the Pyrenees, makes possible the practice of different watersports and fishing.

=== Ascent to Castellar ===
One of the most typical routes in this range is the ascent to Mount Castellar, 1286 m high, starting from the monastery of Leyre and following the Cañada Real de los Roncaleses (GR-13).

== See also ==
- Tiermas

== Bibliography ==
- Pejenaute Goñi, Javier María (2002). Navarra: geografía (in Spanish). Gobierno de Navarra. ISBN 84-235-2294-6. OCLC 54382279.
