= La Patria =

Bolivian newspaper

La Patria is a newspaper published in Oruro, Bolivia. It was founded on 19 March 1919 by Bolivian journalist Demetrio Canelas.

== History ==
La Patria was founded on 19 March 1919 in the city of Oruro by journalist Demetrio Canelas. In its early years the newspaper was printed using the printing press of Enrique Collazos. Over time the newspaper adopted modern printing technologies, including offset printing and later full-color publication.

== See also ==
- Oruro Bolivia
- Journalism
