= Castillonuevo =

Municipality of Spain

Coordinates: 42°40′42″N 1°2′40″W

Castillonuevo (Basque: Gazteluberri) is a town located in the province of Navarre, in the autonomous community of Navarre, northern Spain.

Coat of arms of Castillonuevo (Navarre-Spain)
