= Navascués =

Municipality of Spain

Coordinates: 42°43′N 1°07′W

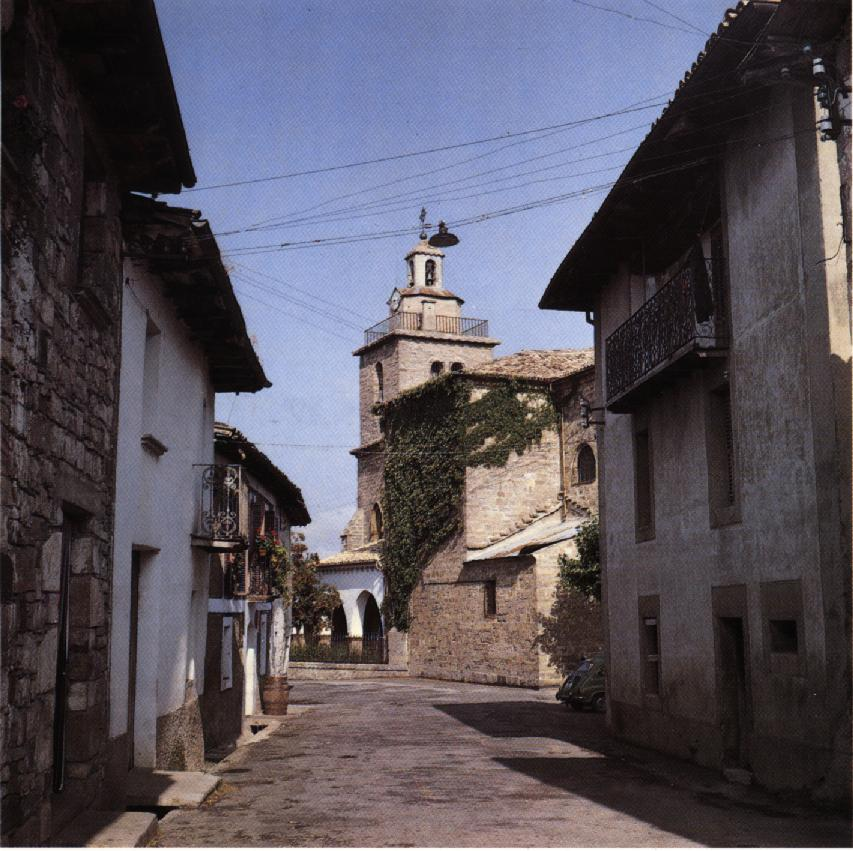
Street of Navascués

Navascués (Nabaskoze in Basque) is a town and municipality in the province and autonomous community of Navarre in northern Spain. It has a population of under 200.

It is located in the non-Basque-speaking area of the province, in Merindad Sangüesa and 62 km from the capital, Pamplona. Spanish is the only official language since Basque has no official status.
