= Cañada Vellida =

Cañada Vellida, Spain
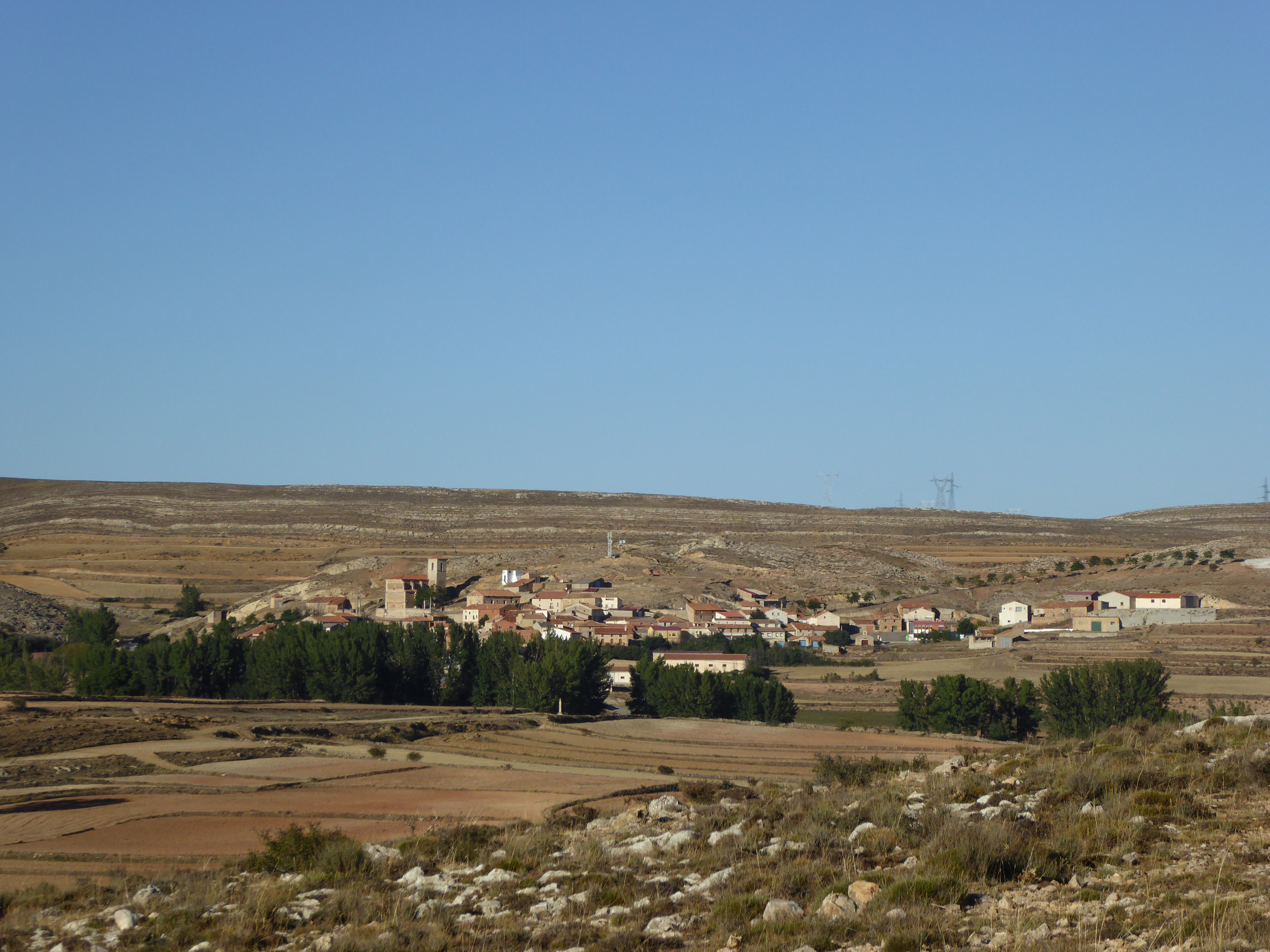

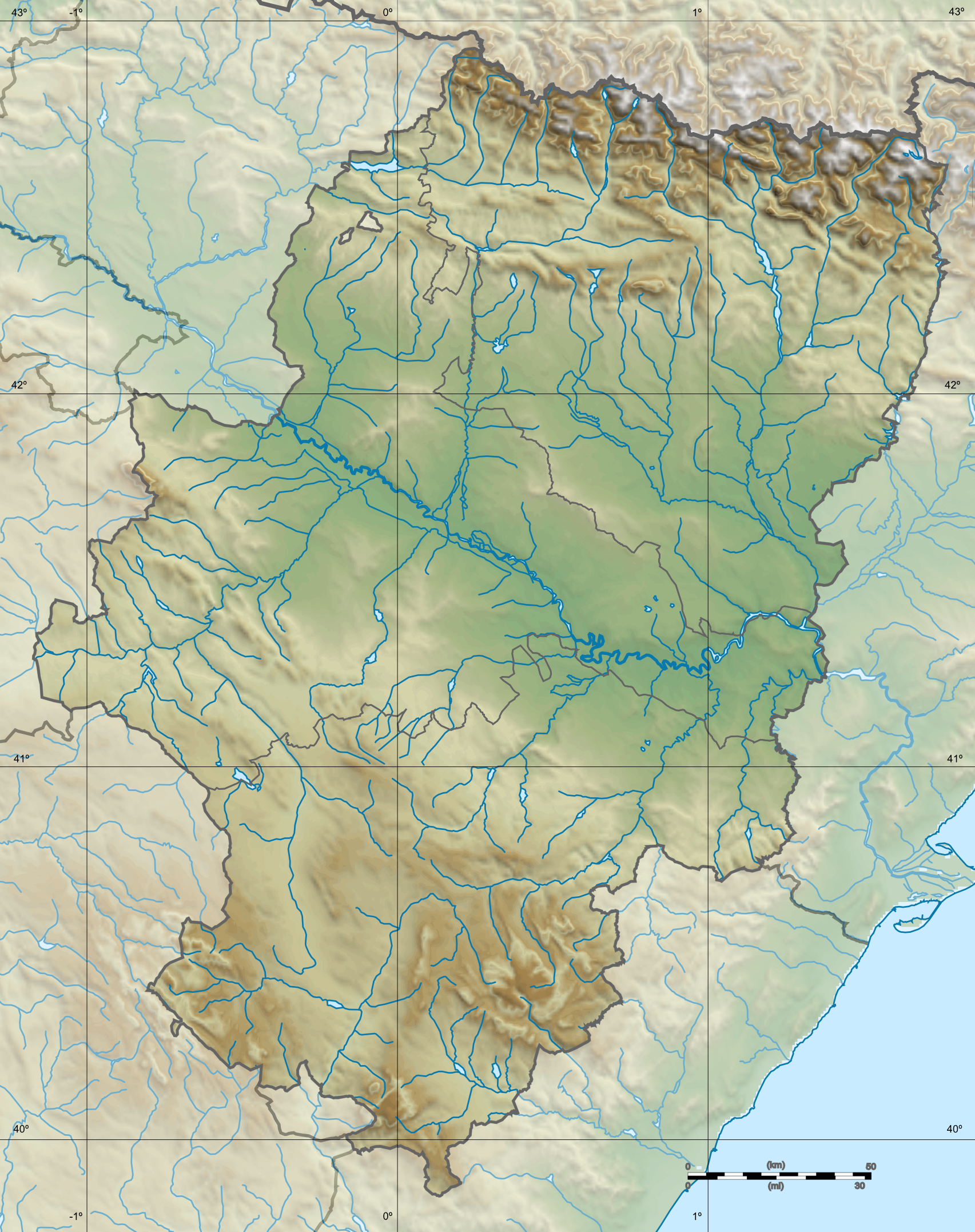
- Location within Aragon Location within Spain
- Coordinates: 40°42′N 0°55′W
- Country: Spain
- Autonomous community: Aragon
- Province: Teruel
- Municipality: Cañada Vellida

Area
  - Total: 23.30 km^{2} (9.00 sq mi)

Population (2025-01-01)
  - Total: 36
  - Density: 1.5/km^{2} (4.0/sq mi)
- Time zone: UTC+1 (CET)
  - Summer (DST): UTC+2 (CEST)

Cañada Vellida is a municipality located in the province of Teruel, Aragon, Spain. According to the 2018 census (INE), the municipality has a population of 35 inhabitants.

== See also ==
- List of municipalities in Teruel
