= Jorcas =

Jorcas, Spain
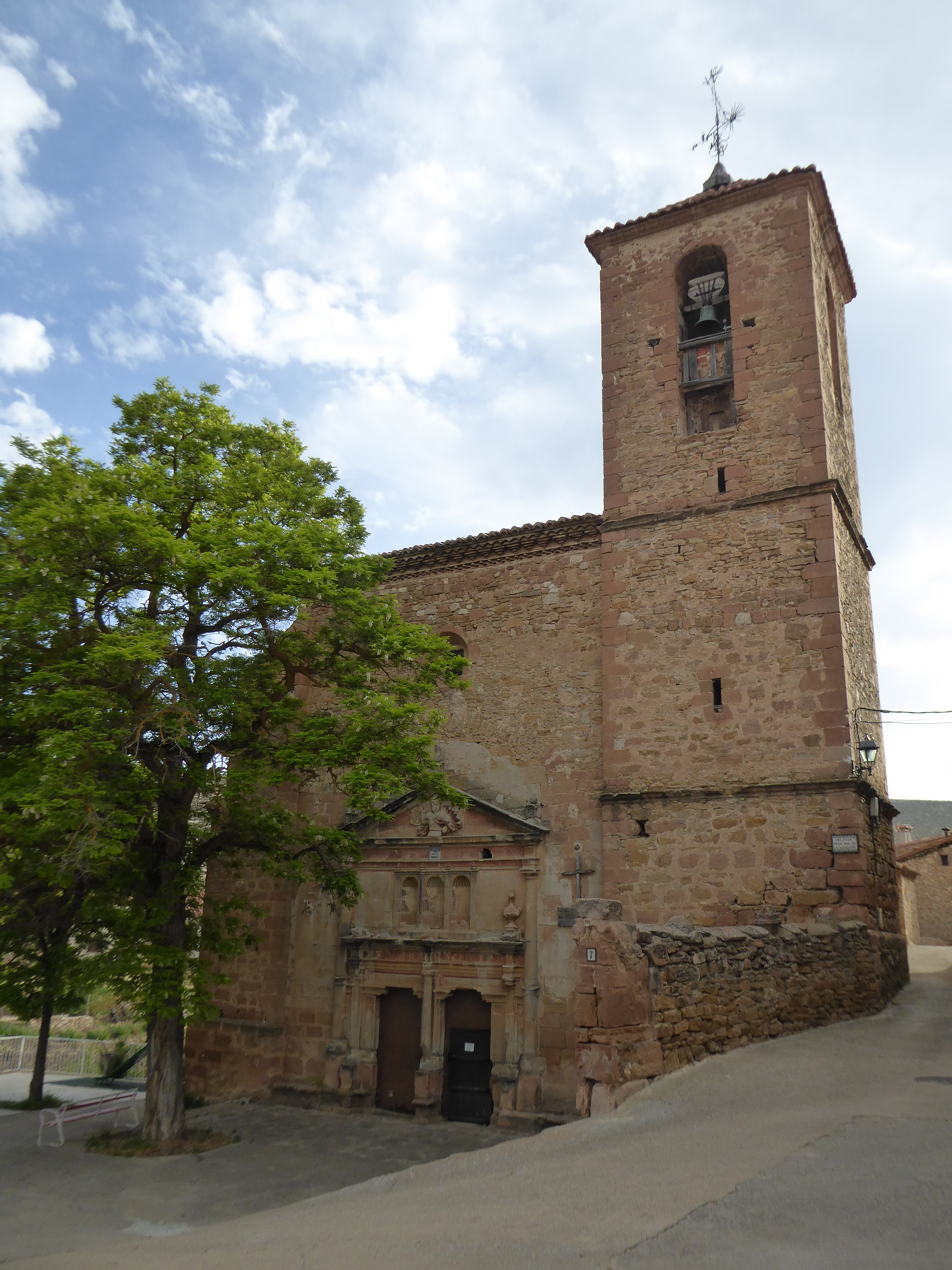

- Location within Spain
- Coordinates: 40°33′N 0°45′W
- Country: Spain
- Autonomous community: Aragon
- Province: Teruel
- Municipality: Jorcas

Area
  - Total: 26.20 km^{2} (10.12 sq mi)
- Elevation: 1,357 m (4,452 ft)

Population (2025-01-01)
  - Total: 42
  - Density: 1.6/km^{2} (4.2/sq mi)
- Time zone: UTC+1 (CET)
  - Summer (DST): UTC+2 (CEST)

Jorcas is a municipality located in the province of Teruel, Aragon, Spain. According to the 2018 census (INE), the municipality has a population of 34 inhabitants.

== See also ==
- List of municipalities in Teruel
