= Jabaloyas =

Jabaloyas, Spain
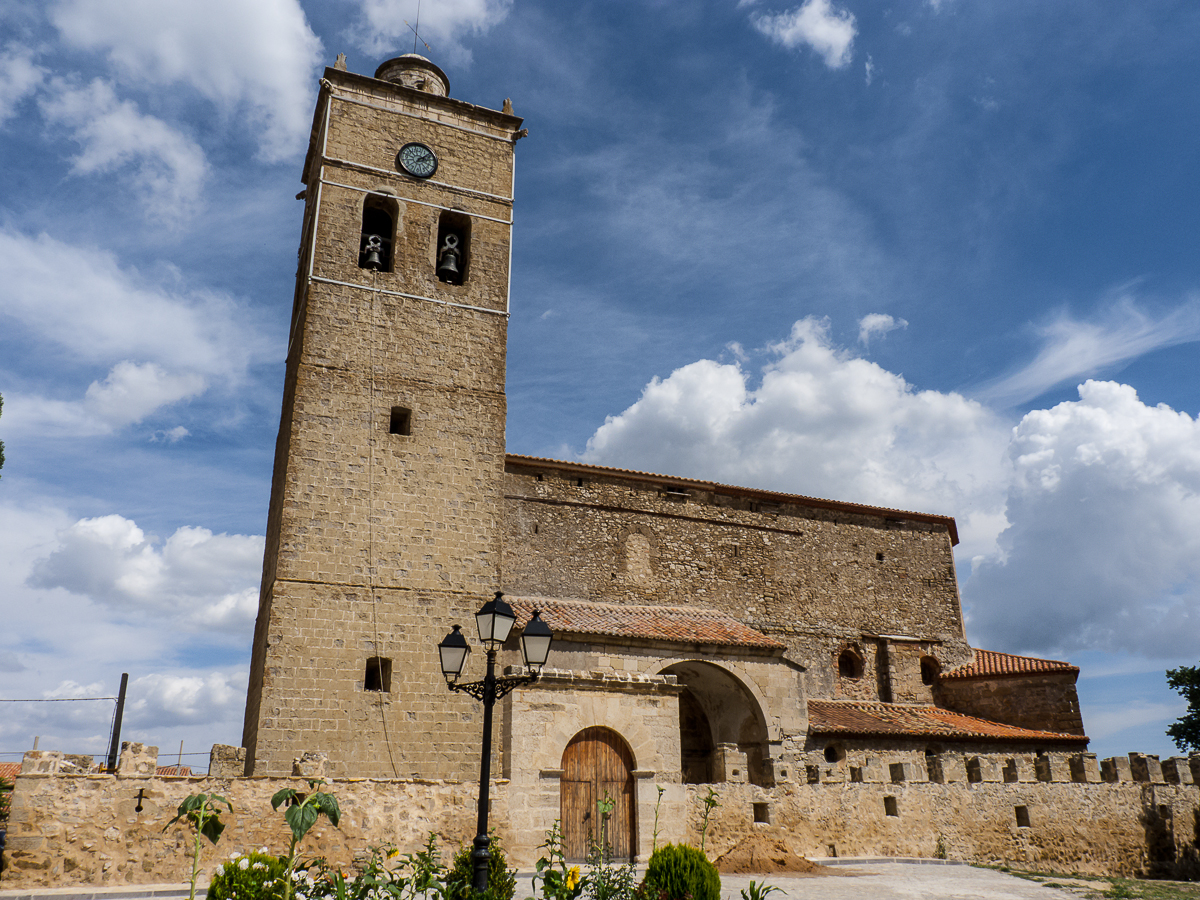

- Flag Coat of arms

- Location within Spain
- Coordinates: 40°14′N 1°24′W
- Country: Spain
- Autonomous community: Aragon
- Province: Teruel
- Municipality: Jabaloyas

Area
  - Total: 61 km^{2} (24 sq mi)
- Elevation: 1,405 m (4,610 ft)

Population (2025-01-01)
  - Total: 66
  - Density: 1.1/km^{2} (2.8/sq mi)
- Time zone: UTC+1 (CET)
  - Summer (DST): UTC+2 (CEST)

Jabaloyas is a municipality located in the province of Teruel, Aragon, Spain. According to the 2004 census (INE), the municipality has a population of 79 inhabitants.

== See also ==
- List of municipalities in Teruel
