= Aguilar del Alfambra =

- municipality
- Location within Spain
- Coordinates: 40°35′N 0°47′W
- Country: Spain
- Autonomous community: Aragon
- Province: Teruel

Area
  - Total: 39.04 km^{2} (15.07 sq mi)
- Elevation: 1,302 m (4,272 ft)

Population (2025-01-01)
  - Total: 82
  - Density: 2.1/km^{2} (5.4/sq mi)
- Time zone: UTC+1 (CET)
  - Summer (DST): UTC+2 (CEST)

Aguilar del Alfambra is a municipality located in the province of Teruel, Aragon, Spain. According to the 2018 census (INE), the municipality has a population of 63 inhabitants.

Vicente Blasco Ibáñez's father was born in this village.

== See also ==
- List of municipalities in Teruel
