= Escorihuela =

- municipality
- Flag Coat of arms

- Location within Spain
- Coordinates: 40°33′N 0°58′W
- Country: Spain
- Autonomous community: Aragon
- Province: Teruel

Area
  - Total: 56 km^{2} (22 sq mi)
- Elevation: 1,133 m (3,717 ft)

Population (2025-01-01)
  - Total: 130
  - Density: 2.3/km^{2} (6.0/sq mi)
- Time zone: UTC+1 (CET)
  - Summer (DST): UTC+2 (CEST)

Escorihuela is a municipality located in the province of Teruel, Aragon, Spain. According to the 2004 census (INE), the municipality has a population of 200 inhabitants.

== See also ==
- List of municipalities in Teruel
