= List of municipalities in Teruel =

Map of Spain with Teruel highlighted

This is a list of the municipalities in the province of Teruel in the autonomous community of Aragon, Spain. There are 236 municipalities in the province.

== List ==
Name	Population (2022)
Ababuj	72
Abejuela	56
Aguatón	16
Aguaviva	556
Aguilar del Alfambra	81
Alacón	219
Alba	181
Albalate del Arzobispo	1,959
Albarracín	1,008
Albentosa	275
Alcaine	46
Alcalá de la Selva	383
Alcañiz	16,054
Alcorisa	3,252
Alfambra	490
Aliaga	323
Allepuz	124
Alloza	553
Allueva	21
Almohaja	16
Alobras	67
Alpeñés	20
Anadón	33
Andorra	7,201
Arcos de las Salinas	117
Arens de Lledó	214
Argente	208
Ariño	665
Azaila	105
Bádenas	19
Báguena	271
Bañón	157
Barrachina	116
Bea	33
Beceite	550
Bello	230
Belmonte de San José	136
Berge	231
Bezas	63
Blancas	140
Blesa	88
Bordón	111
Bronchales	435
Bueña	51
Burbáguena	278
Cabra de Mora	69
Calaceite	993
Calamocha	4,485
Calanda	3,755
Calomarde	77
Camañas	137
Camarena de la Sierra	123
Camarillas	84
Caminreal	625
Cantavieja	707
Cañada de Benatanduz	35
La Cañada de Verich	97
Cañada Vellida	38
Cañizar del Olivar	103
Cascante del Río	66
Castejón de Tornos	53
Castel de Cabra	95
El Castellar	55
Castellote	677
Castelnou	113
Castelserás	793
Cedrillas	634
Celadas	362
Cella	2,611
La Cerollera	74
La Codoñera	317
Corbalán	110
Cortes de Aragón	62
Cosa	50
Cretas	563
Crivillén	90
La Cuba	42
Cubla	60
Cucalón	78
El Cuervo	72
Cuevas de Almudén	126
Cuevas Labradas	133
Ejulve	186
Escorihuela	138
Escucha	773
Estercuel	205
Ferreruela de Huerva	70
Fonfría	30
Formiche Alto	159
Fórnoles	86
Fortanete	209
Foz-Calanda	273
La Fresneda	462
Frías de Albarracín	105
Fuenferrada	35
Fuentes Calientes	89
Fuentes Claras	434
Fuentes de Rubielos	160
Fuentespalda	293
Galve	150
Gargallo	98
Gea de Albarracín	434
La Ginebrosa	200
Griegos	140
Guadalaviar	249
Gúdar	73
Híjar	1,751
Hinojosa de Jarque	106
La Hoz de la Vieja	90
Huesa del Común	71
La Iglesuela del Cid	395
Jabaloyas	65
Jarque de la Val	56
Jatiel	46
Jorcas	36
Josa	42
Lagueruela	71
Lanzuela	25
Libros	102
Lidón	53
Linares de Mora	235
Lledó	171
Loscos	118
Maicas	31
Manzanera	533
Martín del Río	372
Mas de las Matas	1,255
La Mata de los Olmos	270
Mazaleón	487
Mezquita de Jarque	84
Mirambel	111
Miravete de la Sierra	27
Molinos	227
Monforte de Moyuela	75
Monreal del Campo	2,499
Monroyo	312
Montalbán	1,209
Monteagudo del Castillo	43
Monterde de Albarracín	55
Mora de Rubielos	1,569
Moscardón	52
Mosqueruela	551
Muniesa	571
Noguera de Albarracín	138
Nogueras	27
Nogueruelas	205
Obón	35
Odón	217
Ojos Negros	328
Olba	266
Oliete	330
Los Olmos	120
Orihuela del Tremedal	454
Orrios	123
Palomar de Arroyos	172
Pancrudo	123
Las Parras de Castellote	60
Peñarroya de Tastavins	450
Peracense	78
Peralejos	85
Perales del Alfambra	264
Pitarque	69
Plou	47
El Pobo	106
La Portellada	236
Pozondón	48
Pozuel del Campo	60
La Puebla de Híjar	914
La Puebla de Valverde	448
Puertomingalvo	141
Ráfales	146
Rillo	86
Riodeva	136
Ródenas	62
Royuela	225
Rubiales	43
Rubielos de la Cérida	32
Rubielos de Mora	624
Salcedillo	11
Saldón	22
Samper de Calanda	731
San Agustín	134
San Martín del Río	132
Santa Cruz de Nogueras	25
Santa Eulalia del Campo	1,032
Sarrión	1,201
Segura de los Baños	42
Seno	43
Singra	80
Terriente	181
Teruel	35,900
Toril y Masegoso	37
Tormón	26
Tornos	196
Torralba de los Sisones	151
Torre de Arcas	82
Torre de las Arcas	24
Torre del Compte	125
Torre los Negros	81
Torrecilla de Alcañiz	460
Torrecilla del Rebollar	121
Torrelacárcel	140
Torremocha de Jiloca	106
Torres de Albarracín	168
Torrevelilla	170
Torrijas	35
Torrijo del Campo	482
Tramacastiel	66
Tramacastilla	117
Tronchón	61
Urrea de Gaén	440
Utrillas	3,011
Valacloche	26
Valbona	288
Valdealgorfa	591
Valdecuenca	31
Valdelinares	78
Valdeltormo	301
Valderrobres	2,498
Valjunquera	337
El Vallecillo	41
Veguillas de la Sierra	21
Villafranca del Campo	301
Villahermosa del Campo	90
Villanueva del Rebollar de la Sierra	44
Villar del Cobo	165
Villar del Salz	63
Villarluengo	174
Villarquemado	857
Villarroya de los Pinares	172
Villastar	543
Villel	329
Vinaceite	211
Visiedo	118
Vivel del Río Martín	68
La Zoma	30
Total	134,421

== See also ==
- Geography of Spain
- List of cities in Spain
- List of Aragonese comarcas
