= Saldón =

Saldón, Spain
- Location within Spain
- Coordinates: 40°19′N 1°25′W
- Country: Spain
- Autonomous community: Aragon
- Province: Teruel
- Municipality: Saldón

Area
  - Total: 28.37 km^{2} (10.95 sq mi)

Population (2025-01-01)
  - Total: 32
  - Density: 1.1/km^{2} (2.9/sq mi)
- Time zone: UTC+1 (CET)
  - Summer (DST): UTC+2 (CEST)

Saldón is a municipality located in the province of Teruel, Aragon, Spain. According to the 2010 census (INE), the municipality had a population of 29 inhabitants.

== See also ==
- List of municipalities in Teruel
