= Torrelacárcel =

Torrelacárcel, Spain
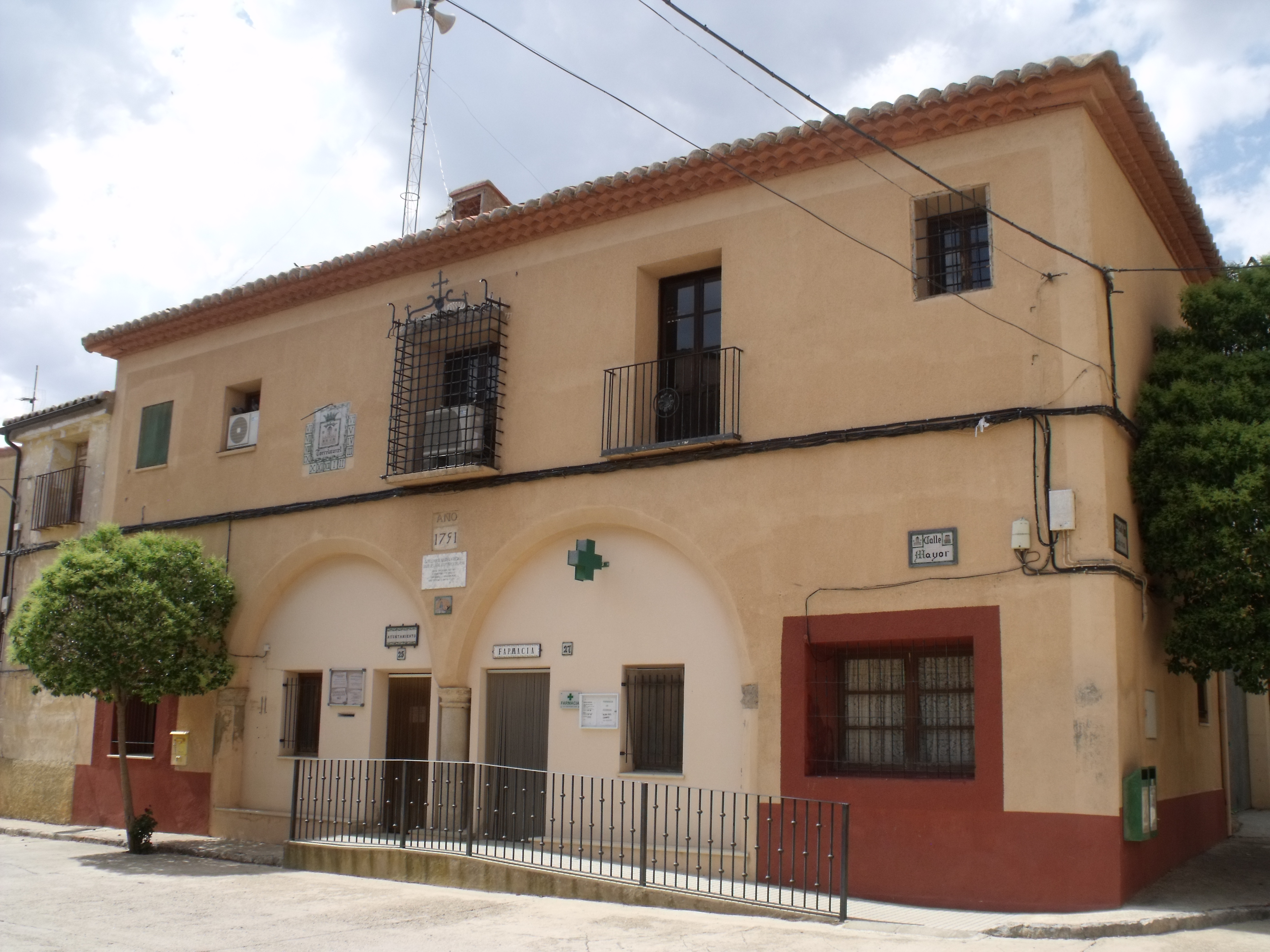
- Town hall

- Coat of arms

- Location within Spain
- Coordinates: 40°37′N 1°18′W
- Country: Spain
- Autonomous community: Aragon
- Province: Teruel
- Municipality: Torrelacárcel

Area
  - Total: 35 km^{2} (14 sq mi)
- Elevation: 979 m (3,212 ft)

Population (2025-01-01)
  - Total: 131
  - Density: 3.7/km^{2} (9.7/sq mi)
- Time zone: UTC+1 (CET)
  - Summer (DST): UTC+2 (CEST)

Torrelacárcel is a municipality located in the province of Teruel, Aragon, Spain. According to the 2004 census (INE), the municipality has a population of 248 inhabitants.

== See also ==
- List of municipalities in Teruel
