= Torre de las Arcas =

- municipality
- Coat of arms

- Location within Spain
- Coordinates: 40°50′N 0°43′W
- Country: Spain
- Autonomous community: Aragon
- Province: Teruel
- Municipality: Torre de las Arcas

Area
  - Total: 36 km^{2} (14 sq mi)
- Elevation: 945 m (3,100 ft)

Population (2025-01-01)
  - Total: 19
  - Density: 0.53/km^{2} (1.4/sq mi)
- Time zone: UTC+1 (CET)
  - Summer (DST): UTC+2 (CEST)

Torre de las Arcas is a municipality located in the province of Teruel, Aragon, Spain. According to the 2004 census (INE), the municipality has a population of 35 inhabitants.

== See also ==
- List of municipalities in Teruel
