= Anadón =

Anadón, Spain
- Coat of arms

- Location within Spain
- Coordinates: 40°59′N 0°59′W
- Country: Spain
- Autonomous community: Aragon
- Province: Teruel
- Municipality: Anadón

Area
  - Total: 24.62 km^{2} (9.51 sq mi)
- Elevation: 1,112 m (3,648 ft)

Population (2025-01-01)
  - Total: 35
  - Density: 1.4/km^{2} (3.7/sq mi)
- Time zone: UTC+1 (CET)
  - Summer (DST): UTC+2 (CEST)

Anadón is a municipality located in the province of Teruel, Aragon, Spain. According to the 2004 census (INE), the municipality had a population of 19 inhabitants.

== See also ==
- List of municipalities in Teruel
