= Alobras =

Alobras, Spain
- Coat of arms

- Location within Spain
- Coordinates: 40°11′N 1°23′W
- Country: Spain
- Autonomous community: Aragon
- Province: Teruel
- Municipality: Alobras

Area
  - Total: 30 km^{2} (12 sq mi)
- Elevation: 1,110 m (3,640 ft)

Population (2025-01-01)
  - Total: 63
  - Density: 2.1/km^{2} (5.4/sq mi)
- Time zone: UTC+1 (CET)
  - Summer (DST): UTC+2 (CEST)

Alobras is a municipality located in the province of Teruel, Aragon, Spain. According to the 2004 census (INE), the municipality has a population of 85 inhabitants.

== See also ==
- List of municipalities in Teruel
