= Almohaja =

- municipality
- Location within Spain
- Coordinates: 40°36′N 1°26′W
- Country: Spain
- Autonomous community: Aragon
- Province: Teruel

Area
  - Total: 25 km^{2} (9.7 sq mi)

Population (2025-01-01)
  - Total: 10
  - Density: 0.40/km^{2} (1.0/sq mi)
- Time zone: UTC+1 (CET)
  - Summer (DST): UTC+2 (CEST)

Almohaja is a municipality located in the province of Teruel, Aragon, Spain. According to the 2004 census (INE), the municipality has a population of 28 inhabitants.

== Geography ==
The town is built on the slope of a hill overlooking a small valley containing a largely drained lagoon. The surrounding area has numerous gullys and ravines of rodeno, a reddish sandstone, containing archaeological remains from different periods. On the opposite side of the valley, the former Ojos Negros–Sagunto mining railway runs past the town. The municipality is part of the Cultural Park of the Ojos Negros Mines together with several other municipalities.

== See also ==
- List of municipalities in Teruel
