= Fuentes Calientes =

Fuentes Calientes, Spain
- Location within Spain
- Coordinates: 40°42′N 0°58′W
- Country: Spain
- Autonomous community: Aragon
- Province: Teruel
- Municipality: Fuentes Calientes

Area
  - Total: 25 km^{2} (9.7 sq mi)
- Elevation: 1,209 m (3,967 ft)

Population (2025-01-01)
  - Total: 89
  - Density: 3.6/km^{2} (9.2/sq mi)
- Time zone: UTC+1 (CET)
  - Summer (DST): UTC+2 (CEST)

Fuentes Calientes is a municipality located in the province of Teruel, Aragon, Spain. According to the 2018 census (INE), the municipality has a population of 101 inhabitants.

== See also ==
- List of municipalities in Teruel
