= Tramacastiel =

- municipality
- Location within Spain
- Coordinates: 40°11′N 1°14′W
- Country: Spain
- Autonomous community: Aragon
- Province: Teruel

Area
  - Total: 47 km^{2} (18 sq mi)
- Elevation: 879 m (2,884 ft)

Population (2025-01-01)
  - Total: 62
  - Density: 1.3/km^{2} (3.4/sq mi)
- Time zone: UTC+1 (CET)
  - Summer (DST): UTC+2 (CEST)

Tramacastiel is a municipality located in the province of Teruel, Aragon, Spain. According to the 2004 census (INE), the municipality has a population of 114 inhabitants.

== See also ==
- List of municipalities in Teruel
