= Cuevas Labradas =

Cuevas Labradas, Spain
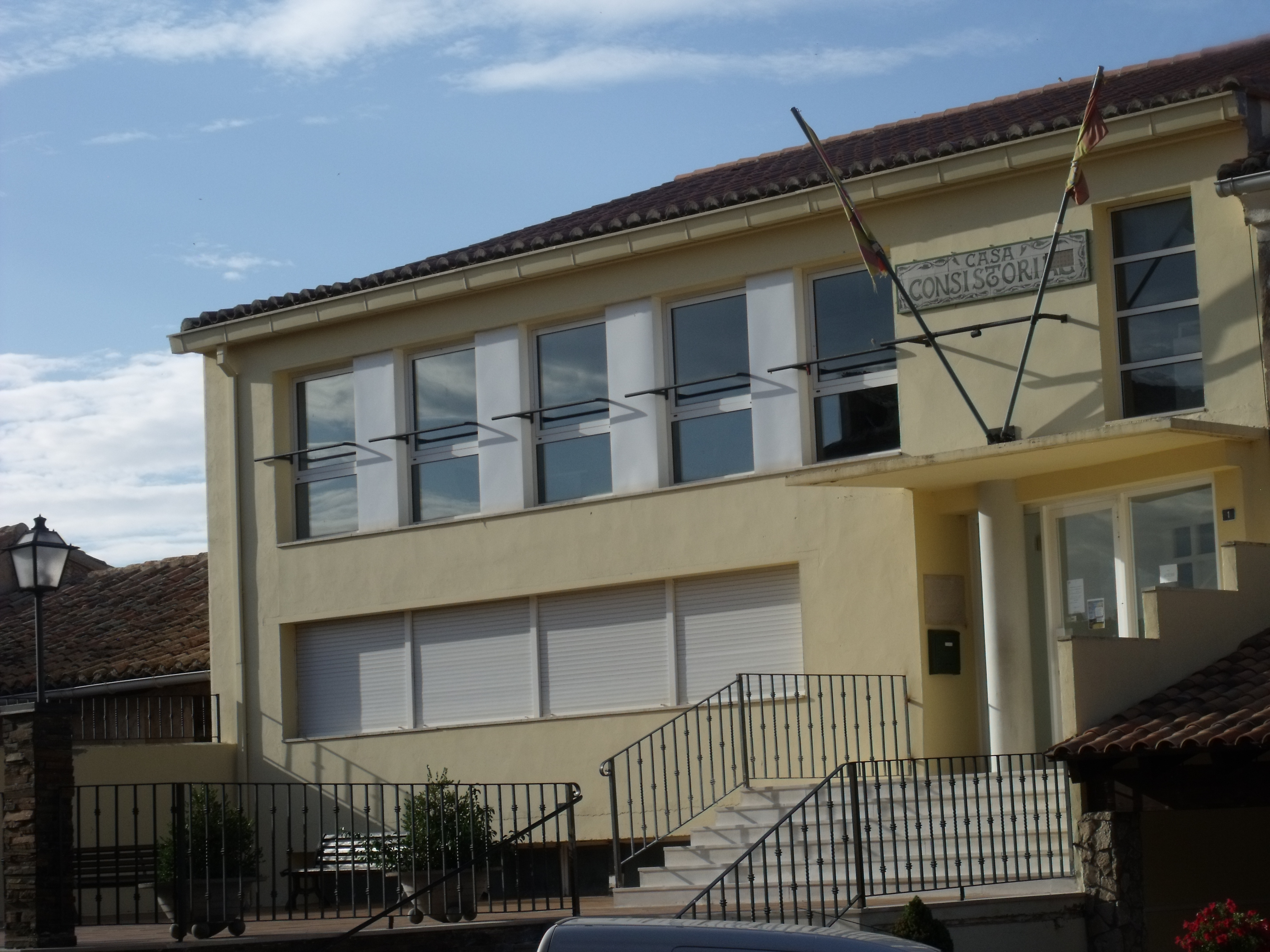
- Cuevas Labradas

- Flag Coat of arms

- Location within Spain
- Coordinates: 40°27′N 1°3′W
- Country: Spain
- Autonomous community: Aragon
- Province: Teruel
- Municipality: Cuevas Labradas

Area
  - Total: 41 km^{2} (16 sq mi)
- Elevation: 968 m (3,176 ft)

Population (2025-01-01)
  - Total: 126
- Time zone: UTC+1 (CET)
  - Summer (DST): UTC+2 (CEST)

Cuevas Labradas is a municipality located in the province of Teruel, Aragon, Spain. According to the 2004 census (INE), the municipality has a population of 153 inhabitants.

== See also ==
- List of municipalities in Teruel
