= Perales del Alfambra =

- municipality
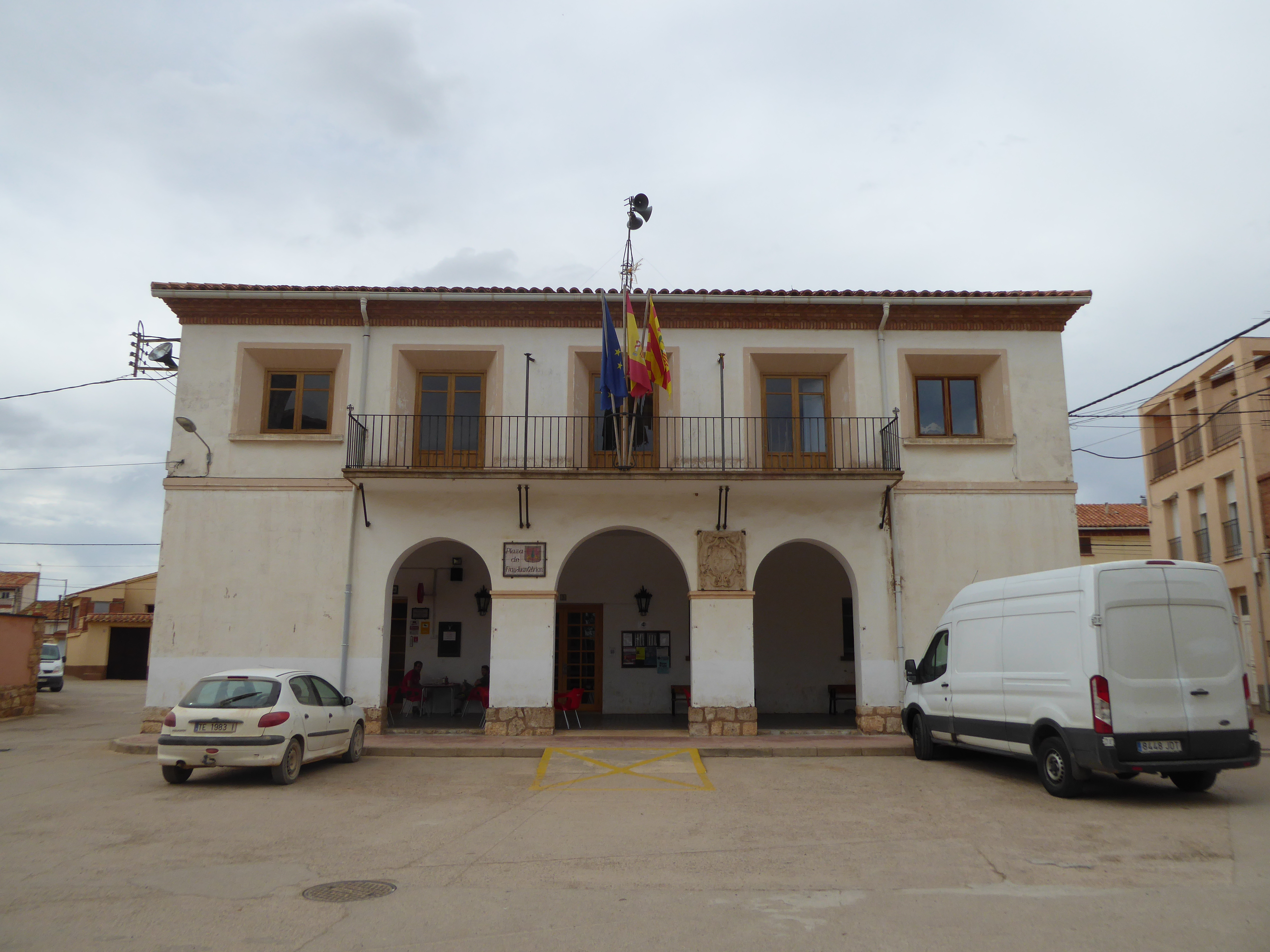
- Town hall

- Location within Spain
- Coordinates: 40°38′N 1°0′W
- Country: Spain
- Autonomous community: Aragon
- Province: Teruel
- Municipality: Perales del Alfambra

Area
  - Total: 103 km^{2} (40 sq mi)
- Elevation: 1,165 m (3,822 ft)

Population (2025-01-01)
  - Total: 293
  - Density: 2.84/km^{2} (7.37/sq mi)
- Time zone: UTC+1 (CET)
  - Summer (DST): UTC+2 (CEST)

Perales del Alfambra is a municipality located in the province of Teruel, Aragon, Spain. According to the 2018 census (INE), the municipality has a population of 221 inhabitants.

== See also ==
- List of municipalities in Teruel
