= La Zoma =

- municipality
- Location within Spain
- Coordinates: 40°47′N 0°37′W
- Country: Spain
- Autonomous community: Aragon
- Province: Teruel
- Municipality: La Zoma

Area
  - Total: 14 km^{2} (5.4 sq mi)

Population (2025-01-01)
  - Total: 28
  - Density: 2.0/km^{2} (5.2/sq mi)
- Time zone: UTC+1 (CET)
  - Summer (DST): UTC+2 (CEST)

La Zoma is a municipality located in the province of Teruel, Aragon, Spain. According to the 2004 census (INE), the municipality has a population of 27 inhabitants.

== See also ==
- List of municipalities in Teruel
