= Alcaine =

Alcaine, Spain
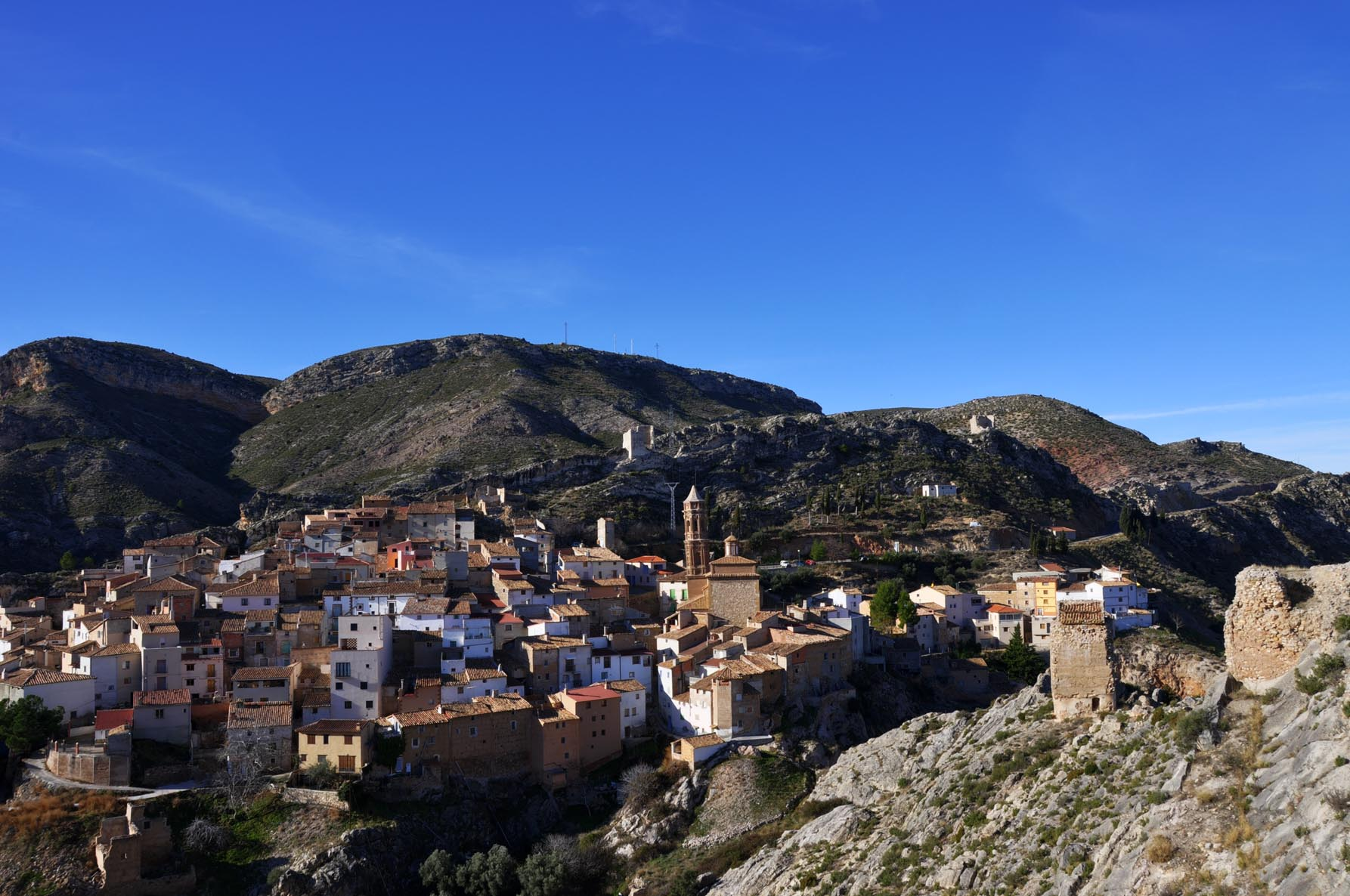

- Coat of arms

- Location within Spain
- Coordinates: 40°57′N 0°42′W
- Country: Spain
- Autonomous community: Aragon
- Province: Teruel
- Municipality: Alcaine

Area
  - Total: 57.38 km^{2} (22.15 sq mi)
- Elevation: 649 m (2,129 ft)

Population (2025-01-01)
  - Total: 38
  - Density: 0.66/km^{2} (1.7/sq mi)
- Time zone: UTC+1 (CET)
  - Summer (DST): UTC+2 (CEST)

Alcaine is a municipality located in the province of Teruel, Aragon, Spain. According to the 2004 census (INE), the municipality had a population of 65 inhabitants.

== See also ==
- List of municipalities in Teruel
