= Cañizar del Olivar =

- municipality
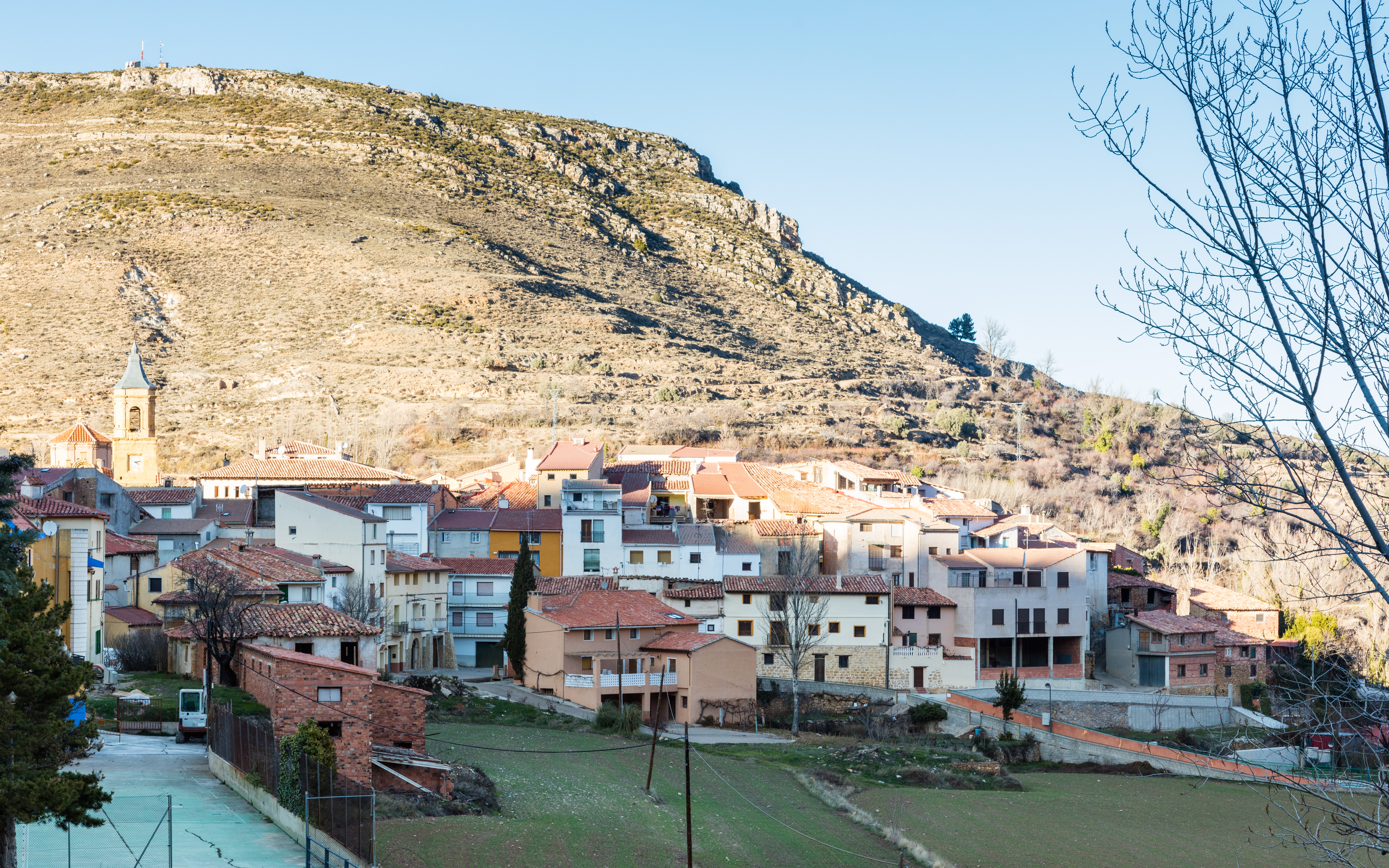

- Coat of arms

- Location within Spain
- Coordinates: 40°49′N 0°39′W
- Country: Spain
- Autonomous community: Aragon
- Province: Teruel

Area
  - Total: 18 km^{2} (6.9 sq mi)
- Elevation: 954 m (3,130 ft)

Population (2025-01-01)
  - Total: 112
  - Density: 6.2/km^{2} (16/sq mi)
- Time zone: UTC+1 (CET)
  - Summer (DST): UTC+2 (CEST)

Cañizar del Olivar is a municipality located in the province of Teruel, Aragon, Spain. According to the 2004 census (INE), the municipality has a population of 113 inhabitants.

== See also ==
- List of municipalities in Teruel
