= Rubiales, Aragon =

Rubiales, Spain
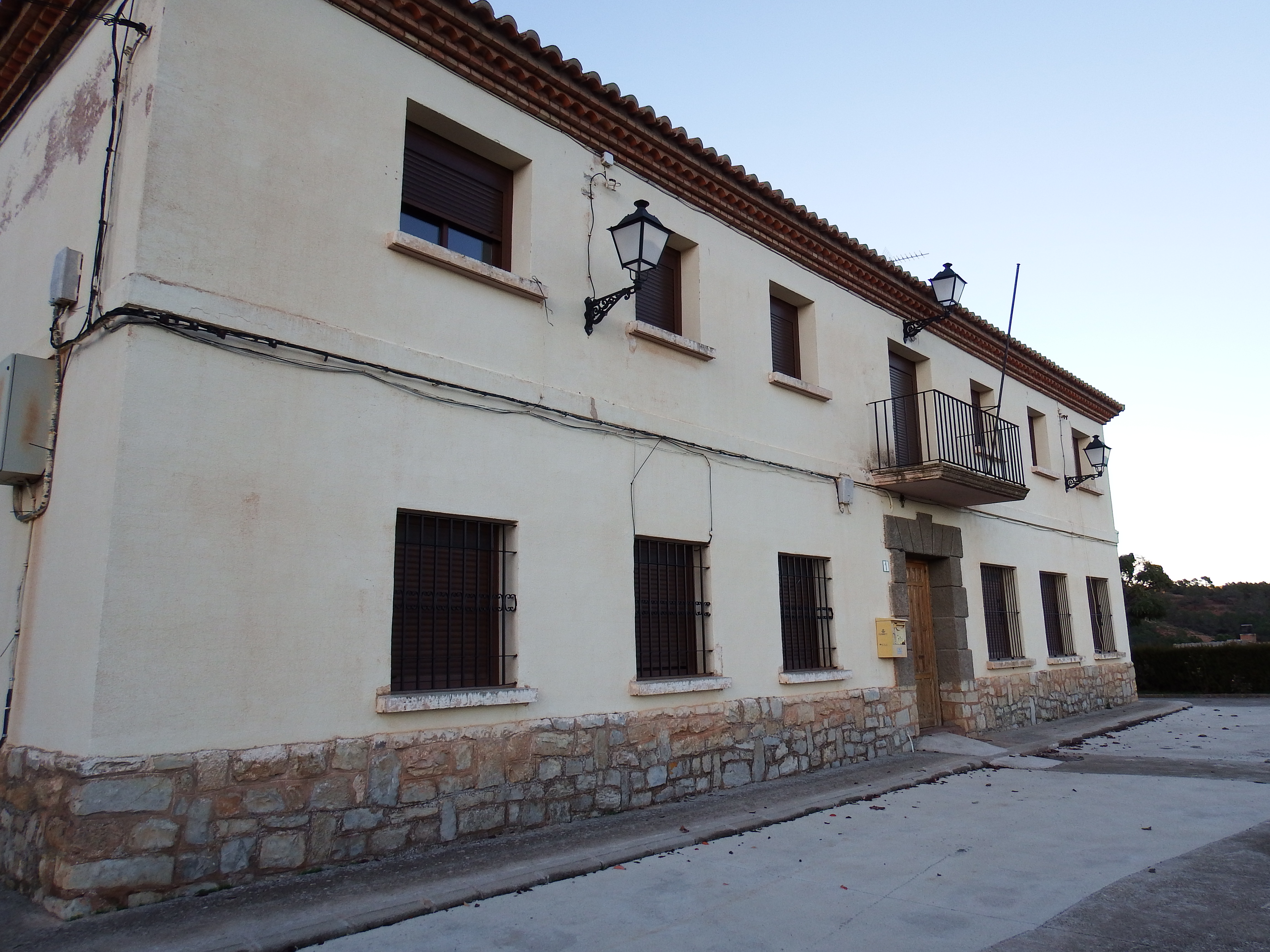
- Town hall

- Location within Spain
- Coordinates: 40°17′N 1°16′W
- Country: Spain
- Autonomous community: Aragon
- Province: Teruel
- Municipality: Rubiales

Area
  - Total: 27.74 km^{2} (10.71 sq mi)

Population (2025-01-01)
  - Total: 43
- Time zone: UTC+1 (CET)
  - Summer (DST): UTC+2 (CEST)

Rubiales is a municipality located in the province of Teruel, Aragon, Spain. According to the 2004 census (INE), the municipality has a population of 60 inhabitants.

== See also ==
- List of municipalities in Teruel
