= Monteagudo del Castillo =

Spanish municipality in Teruel, Aragon, with 68 inhabitants

- municipality
- Location within Spain
- Coordinates: 40°27′N 0°49′W
- Country: Spain
- Autonomous community: Aragon
- Province: Teruel
- Municipality: Monteagudo del Castillo

Area
  - Total: 44 km^{2} (17 sq mi)
- Elevation: 1,450 m (4,760 ft)

Population (2025-01-01)
  - Total: 43
  - Density: 0.98/km^{2} (2.5/sq mi)
- Time zone: UTC+1 (CET)
  - Summer (DST): UTC+2 (CEST)

Monteagudo del Castillo is a municipality located in the province of Teruel, Aragon, Spain. According to the 2004 census (INE), the municipality has a population of 68 inhabitants.

== See also ==
- List of municipalities in Teruel
