= Pitarque =

- municipality
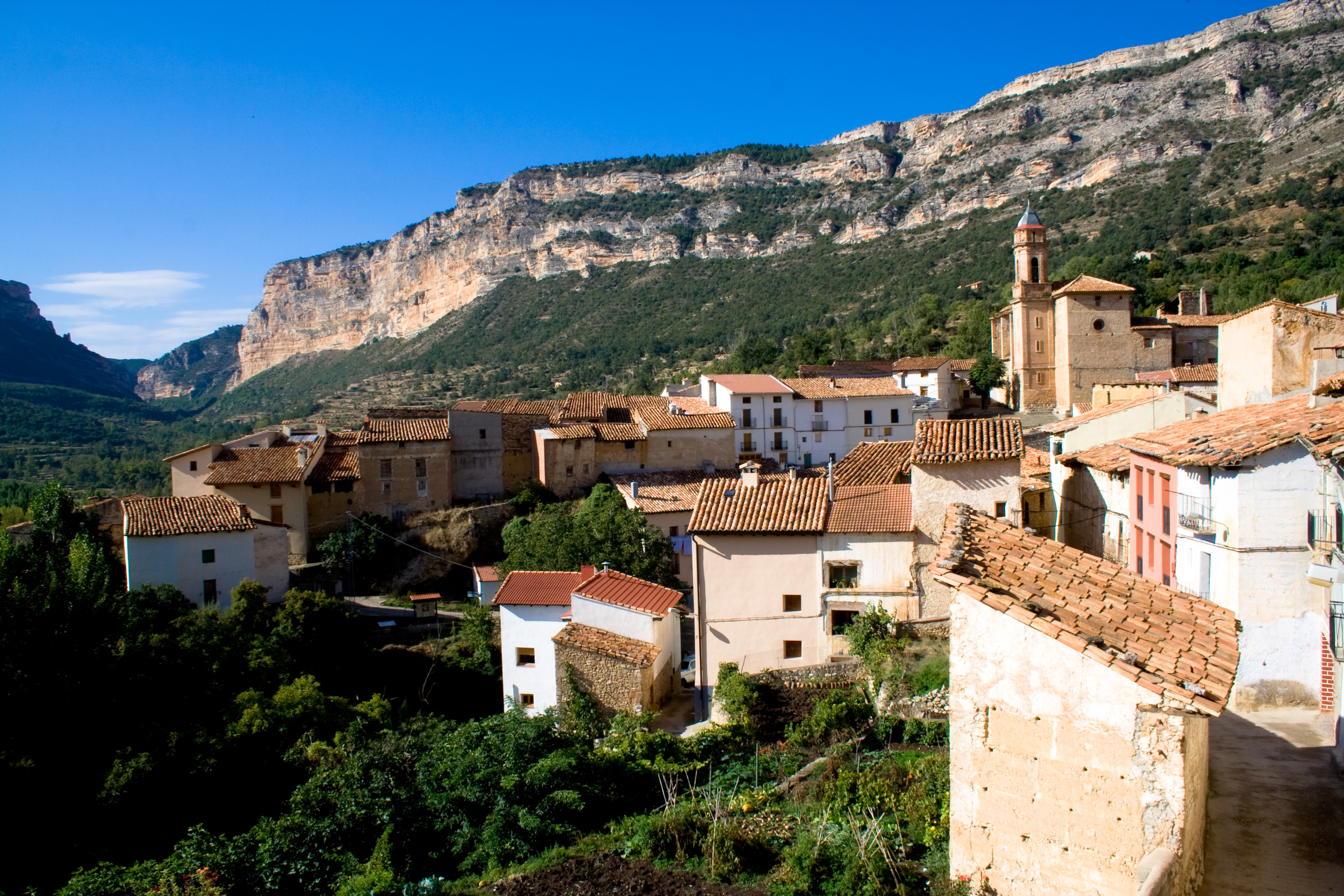

- Coat of arms

- Location within Spain
- Coordinates: 40°39′N 0°35′W
- Country: Spain
- Autonomous community: Aragon
- Province: Teruel
- Municipality: Pitarque

Area
  - Total: 54 km^{2} (21 sq mi)

Population (2025-01-01)
  - Total: 62
  - Density: 1.1/km^{2} (3.0/sq mi)
- Time zone: UTC+1 (CET)
  - Summer (DST): UTC+2 (CEST)

Pitarque is a municipality located in the province of Teruel, Aragon, Spain. According to the 2004 census (INE), the municipality has a population of 112 inhabitants.

== See also ==
- List of municipalities in Teruel
