= Las Parras de Castellote =

- municipality
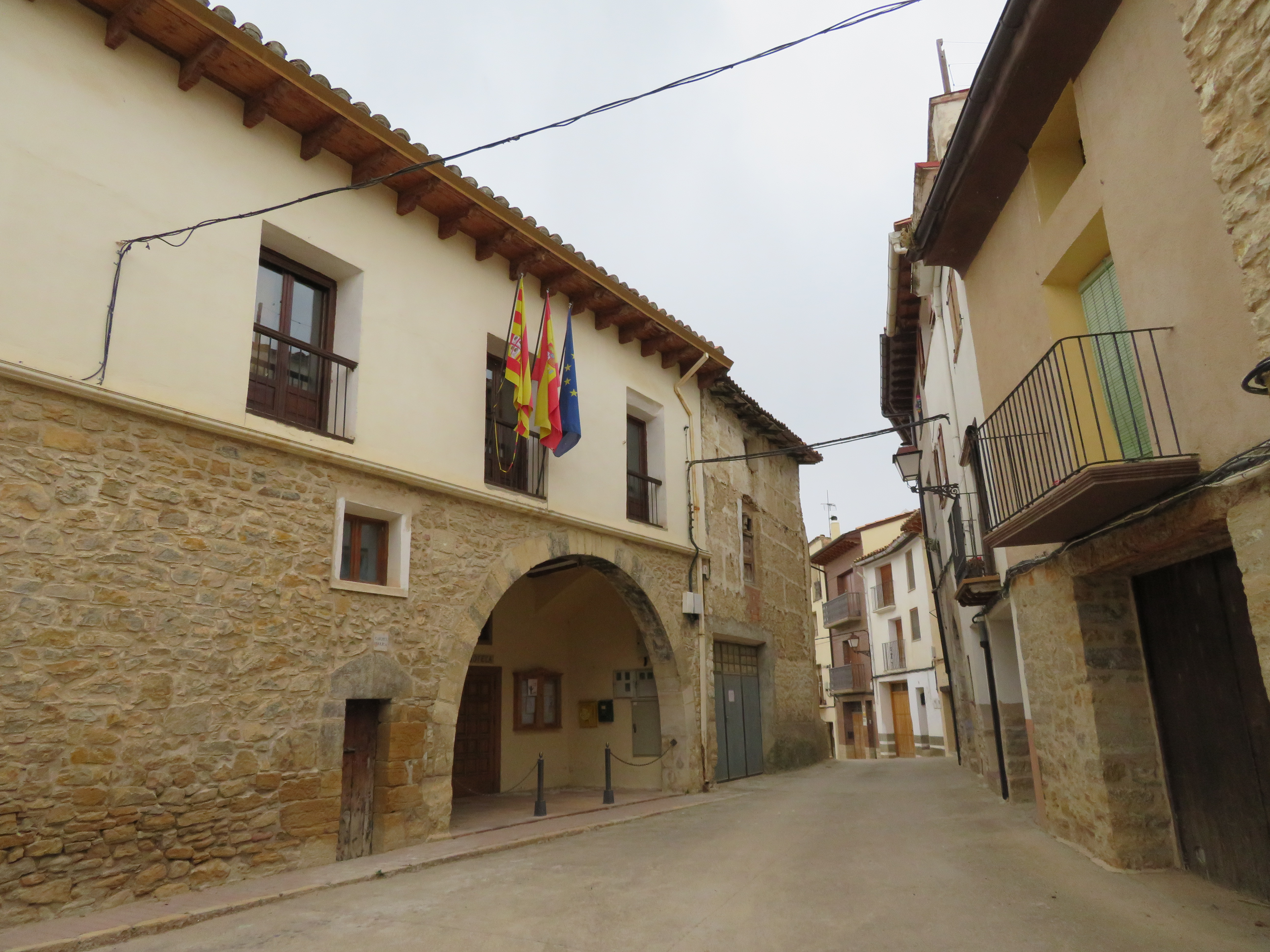
- Town hall

- Coat of arms

- Location within Spain
- Coordinates: 40°47′N 0°14′W
- Country: Spain
- Autonomous community: Aragon
- Province: Teruel
- Municipality: Las Parras de Castellote

Area
  - Total: 41 km^{2} (16 sq mi)
- Elevation: 697 m (2,287 ft)

Population (2025-01-01)
  - Total: 61
  - Density: 1.5/km^{2} (3.9/sq mi)
- Time zone: UTC+1 (CET)
  - Summer (DST): UTC+2 (CEST)

Las Parras de Castellote is a municipality located in the province of Teruel, Aragon, Spain. According to the 2004 census (INE), the municipality has a population of 86 inhabitants.

== See also ==
- List of municipalities in Teruel
