= Obón =

- municipality
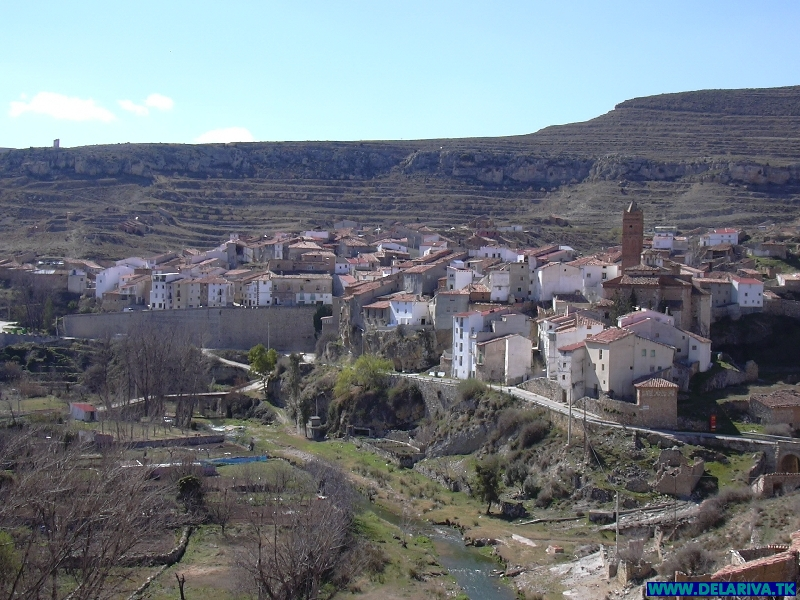

- Coat of arms

- Location within Spain
- Coordinates: 40°54′N 0°43′W
- Country: Spain
- Autonomous community: Aragon
- Province: Teruel
- Municipality: Obón

Area
  - Total: 68.4 km^{2} (26.4 sq mi)
- Elevation: 685 m (2,247 ft)

Population (2025-01-01)
  - Total: 35
  - Density: 0.51/km^{2} (1.3/sq mi)
- Time zone: UTC+1 (CET)
  - Summer (DST): UTC+2 (CEST)

Obón is a municipality located in the province of Teruel, Aragon, Spain. According to the 2004 census (INE), the municipality has a population of 75 inhabitants.

== See also ==
- List of municipalities in Teruel
