= Cuevas de Almudén =

Cuevas de Almudén, Spain
- Location within Spain
- Coordinates: 40°43′N 0°49′W
- Country: Spain
- Autonomous community: Aragon
- Province: Teruel
- Municipality: Cuevas de Almudén

Area
  - Total: 35.85 km^{2} (13.84 sq mi)
- Elevation: 1,281 m (4,203 ft)

Population (2025-01-01)
  - Total: 119
  - Density: 3.32/km^{2} (8.60/sq mi)
- Time zone: UTC+1 (CET)
  - Summer (DST): UTC+2 (CEST)

Cuevas de Almudén is a municipality located in the province of Teruel, Aragon, Spain. According to the 2004 census (INE), the municipality has a population of 115 inhabitants.

== See also ==
- List of municipalities in Teruel
