= Huesa del Común =

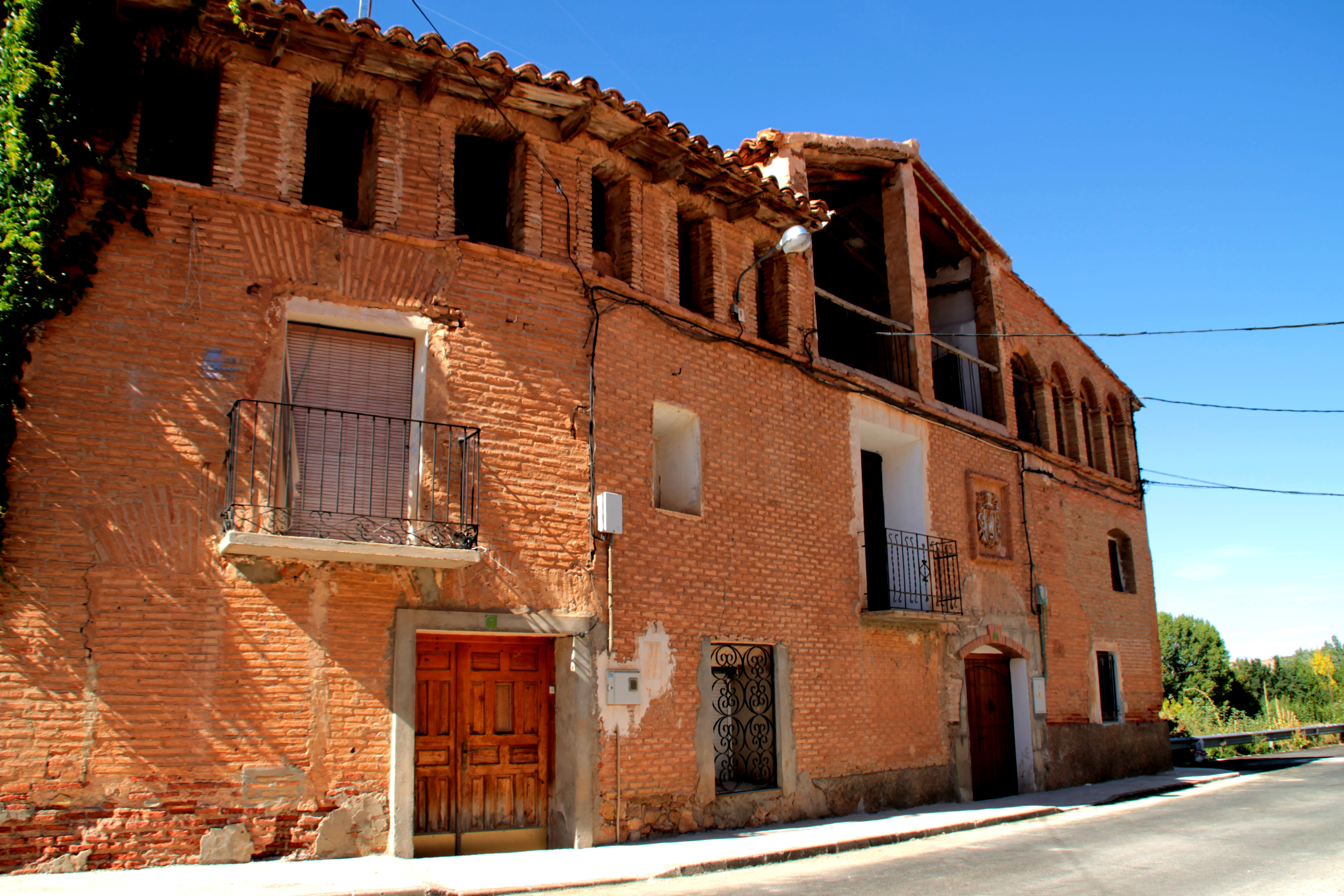

- Coat of arms

- Location within Spain
- Coordinates: 41°1′N 0°55′W
- Country: Spain
- Autonomous community: Aragon
- Province: Teruel
- Municipality: Huesa del Común

Area
  - Total: 61 km^{2} (24 sq mi)
- Elevation: 869 m (2,851 ft)

Population (2025-01-01)
  - Total: 55
  - Density: 0.90/km^{2} (2.3/sq mi)
- Time zone: UTC+1 (CET)
  - Summer (DST): UTC+2 (CEST)

Huesa del Común is a municipality located in the province of Teruel, Aragon, Spain. It has a population of 55 (register office, 2025).

== See also ==
- List of municipalities in Teruel
