= Valdealgorfa =

- municipality
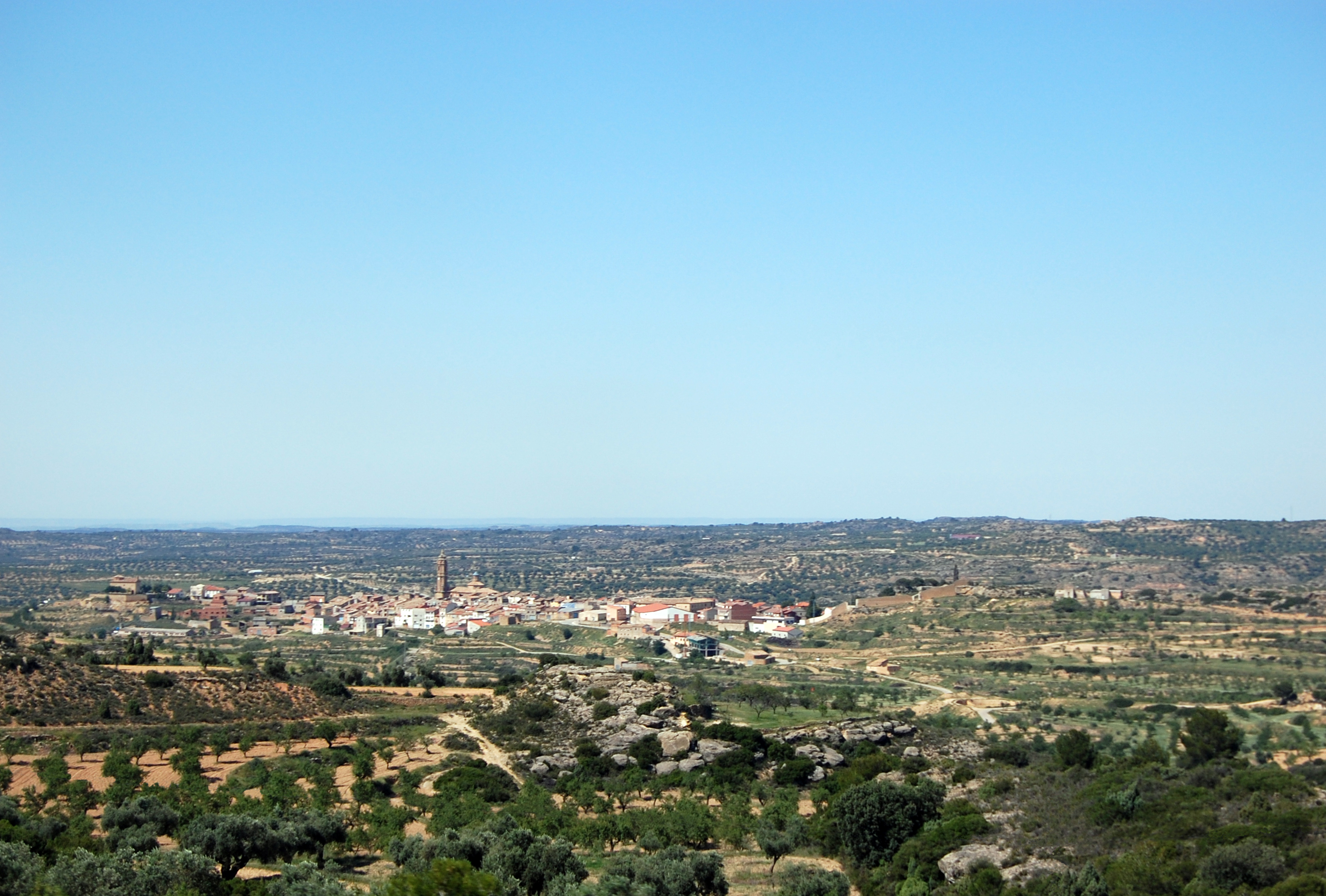

- Coat of arms

- Location within Aragon Location within Spain
- Coordinates: 40°59′N 0°2′W
- Country: Spain
- Autonomous community: Aragon
- Province: Teruel
- Municipality: Valdealgorfa

Area
  - Total: 47 km^{2} (18 sq mi)
- Elevation: 510 m (1,670 ft)

Population (2025-01-01)
  - Total: 581
  - Density: 12/km^{2} (32/sq mi)
- Time zone: UTC+1 (CET)
  - Summer (DST): UTC+2 (CEST)

Valdealgorfa is a municipality located in the province of Teruel, Aragon, Spain. According to the 2004 census (INE), the municipality has a population of 728 inhabitants.

== See also ==
- List of municipalities in Teruel
