= Royuela =

- municipality
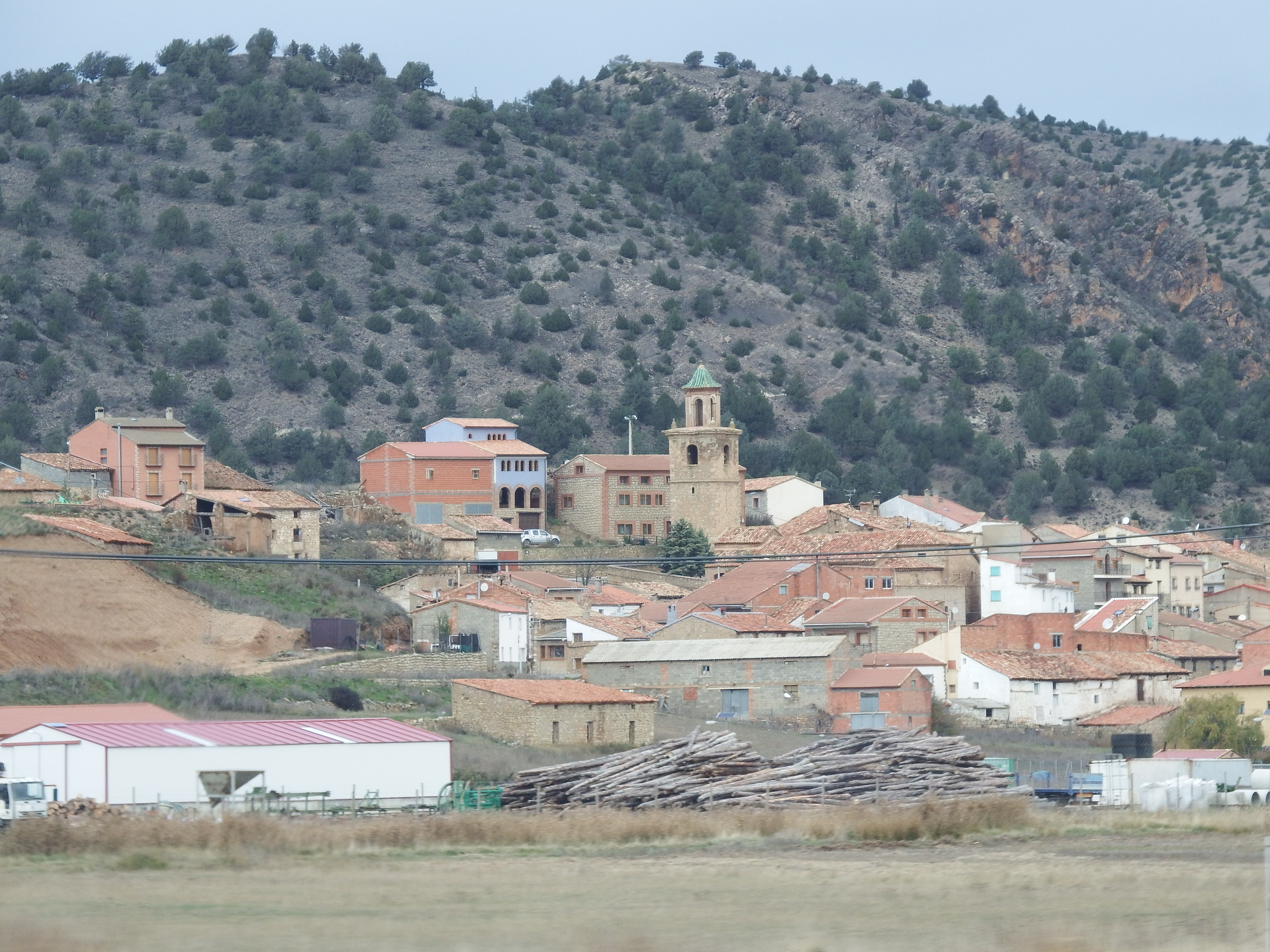
- Royuela, Teruel, Spain

- Location within Spain
- Coordinates: 40°15′N 0°51′W
- Country: Spain
- Autonomous community: Aragon
- Province: Teruel
- Municipality: Royuela

Area
  - Total: 32.50 km^{2} (12.55 sq mi)

Population (2025-01-01)
  - Total: 229
  - Density: 7.05/km^{2} (18.2/sq mi)
- Time zone: UTC+1 (CET)
  - Summer (DST): UTC+2 (CEST)

Royuela is a municipality located in the province of Teruel, Aragon, Spain. According to the 2004 census (INE), the municipality has a population of 225.

== See also ==
- List of municipalities in Teruel
