= El Cuervo, Aragon =

El Cuervo
- municipality
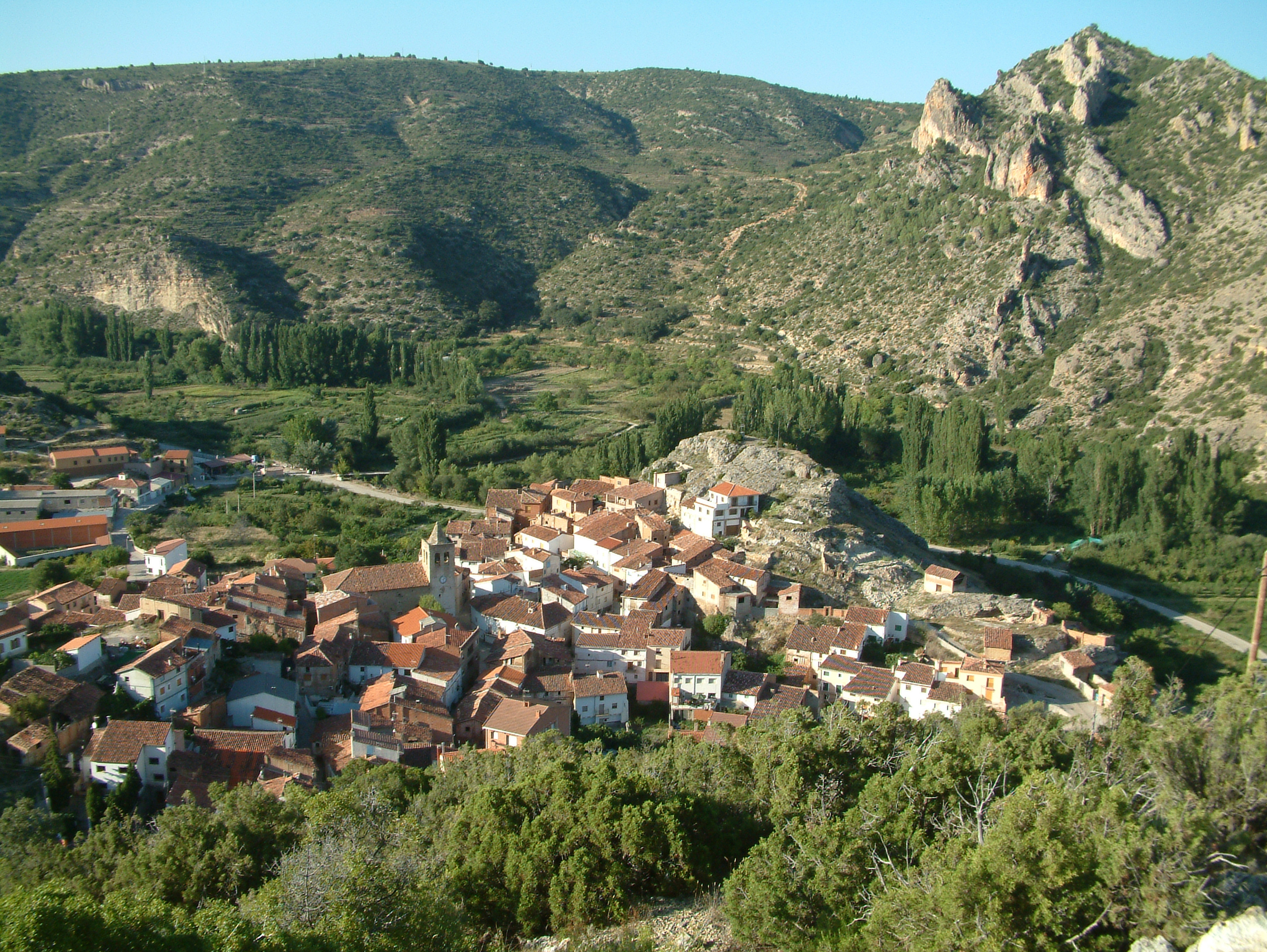

- Location within Spain
- Coordinates: 40°9′N 1°19′W
- Country: Spain
- Autonomous community: Aragon
- Province: Teruel

Area
  - Total: 20.76 km^{2} (8.02 sq mi)
- Elevation: 905 m (2,969 ft)

Population (2025-01-01)
  - Total: 88
  - Density: 4.2/km^{2} (11/sq mi)
- Time zone: UTC+1 (CET)
  - Summer (DST): UTC+2 (CEST)

El Cuervo is a municipality located in the province of Teruel, Aragon, Spain. According to the 2018 census (INE), the municipality has a population of 86 inhabitants.

== See also ==
- List of municipalities in Teruel
