= Jarque de la Val =

Jarque de la Val, Spain
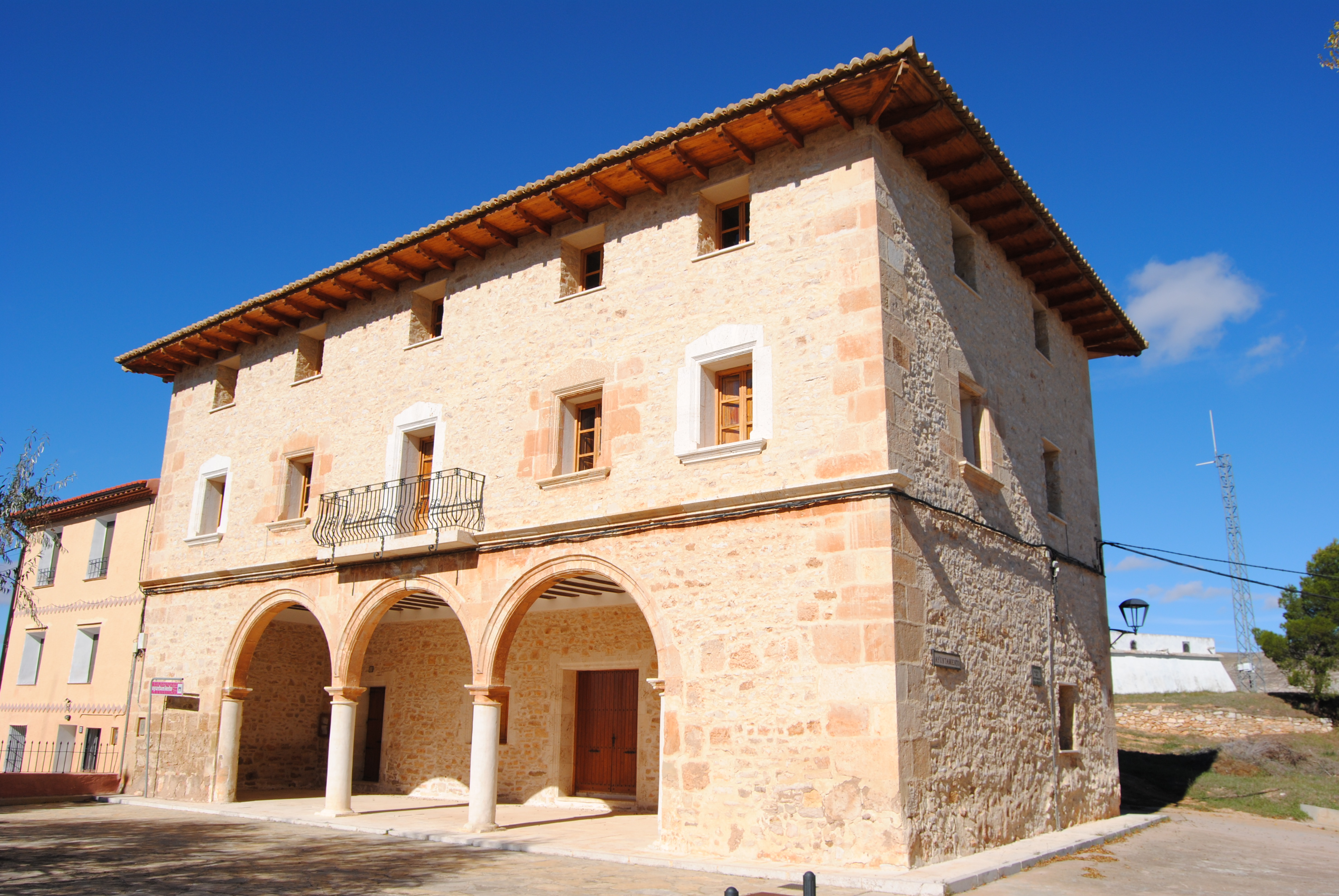
- Town hall

- Location within Spain
- Coordinates: 40°42′N 0°48′W
- Country: Spain
- Autonomous community: Aragon
- Province: Teruel
- Municipality: Jarque de la Val

Area
  - Total: 29 km^{2} (11 sq mi)
- Elevation: 1,269 m (4,163 ft)

Population (2025-01-01)
  - Total: 66
  - Density: 2.3/km^{2} (5.9/sq mi)
- Time zone: UTC+1 (CET)
  - Summer (DST): UTC+2 (CEST)

Jarque de la Val is a municipality located in the province of Teruel, Aragon, Spain. According to the 2004 census (INE), the municipality has a population of 96 inhabitants.

== See also ==
- List of municipalities in Teruel
