= Torres de Albarracín =

Torres de Albarracín, Spain
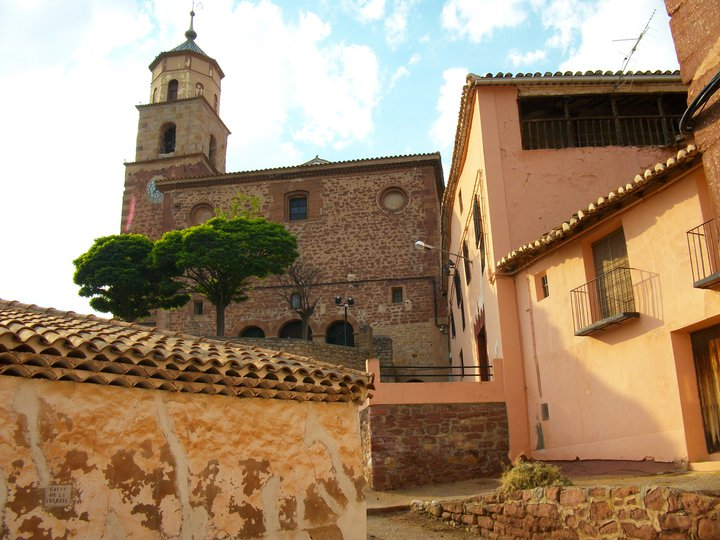

- Location within Spain
- Coordinates: 40°26′N 1°32′W
- Country: Spain
- Autonomous community: Aragon
- Province: Teruel
- Municipality: Torres de Albarracín

Area
  - Total: 28.20 km^{2} (10.89 sq mi)

Population (2025-01-01)
  - Total: 187
  - Density: 6.63/km^{2} (17.2/sq mi)
- Time zone: UTC+1 (CET)
  - Summer (DST): UTC+2 (CEST)

Torres de Albarracín is a municipality located in the province of Teruel, Aragon, Spain. According to the 2004 census (INE), the municipality had a population of 147 inhabitants.

== See also ==
- List of municipalities in Teruel
