= Mirambel =

Municipality in Aragon, Spain

- municipality
- Location within Spain
- Coordinates: 40°35′N 0°20′W
- Country: Spain
- Autonomous community: Aragon
- Province: Teruel

Area
  - Total: 45.47 km^{2} (17.56 sq mi)
- Elevation: 993 m (3,258 ft)

Population (2025-01-01)
  - Total: 110
  - Density: 2.4/km^{2} (6.3/sq mi)
- Time zone: UTC+1 (CET)
  - Summer (DST): UTC+2 (CEST)

Mirambel is a municipality located in the province of Teruel, Aragon, Spain. According to the 2004 census (INE), the municipality had a population of 137 inhabitants.

== See also ==
- List of municipalities in Teruel
