= Alpeñés =

Alpeñés, Spain
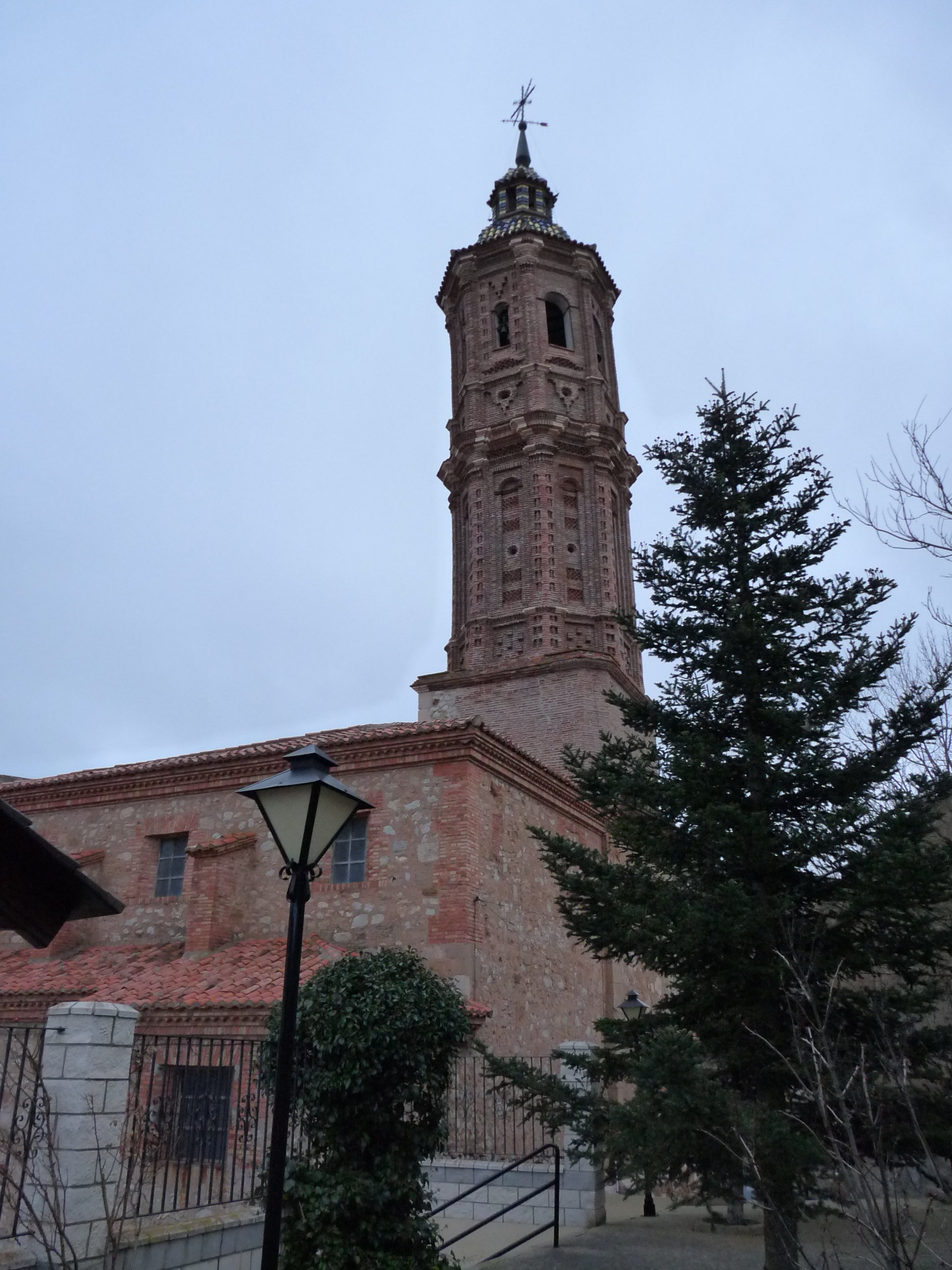

- Location within Spain
- Coordinates: 40°48′N 1°4′W
- Country: Spain
- Autonomous community: Aragon
- Province: Teruel
- Municipality: Alpeñés

Area
  - Total: 28 km^{2} (11 sq mi)
- Elevation: 1,223 m (4,012 ft)

Population (2025-01-01)
  - Total: 27
  - Density: 0.96/km^{2} (2.5/sq mi)
- Time zone: UTC+1 (CET)
  - Summer (DST): UTC+2 (CEST)

Alpeñés (Spanish pronunciation: [al.pe.ˈɲes]) is a municipality located in the province of Teruel, Aragon, Spain. According to the 2018 census (INE), the municipality has a population of 22 inhabitants.

== See also ==
- List of municipalities in Teruel
