= Camañas =

Camañas, Spain
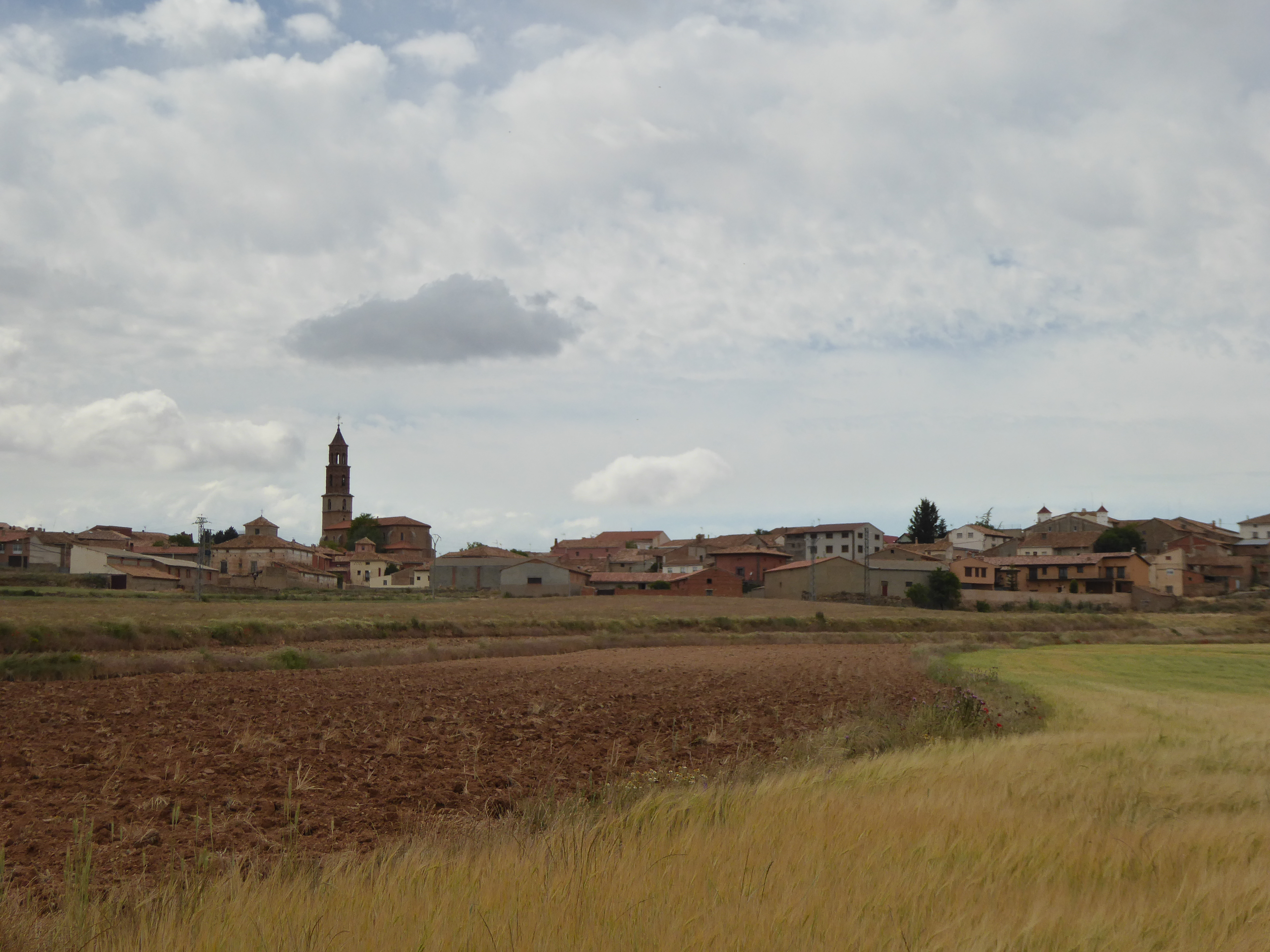

- Coat of arms

- Location within Spain
- Coordinates: 40°38′N 1°8′W
- Country: Spain
- Autonomous community: Aragon
- Province: Teruel
- Municipality: Camañas

Area
  - Total: 78 km^{2} (30 sq mi)

Population (2025-01-01)
  - Total: 136
  - Density: 1.7/km^{2} (4.5/sq mi)
- Time zone: UTC+1 (CET)
  - Summer (DST): UTC+2 (CEST)

Camañas is a municipality located in the province of Teruel, Aragon, Spain. According to the 2018 census (INE), the municipality has a population of 124 inhabitants.

== See also ==
- List of municipalities in Teruel
