= Alacón =

Alacón, Spain
- Flag Coat of arms

- Location within Spain
- Coordinates: 41°01′N 0°41′W
- Country: Spain
- Autonomous community: Aragon
- Province: Teruel
- Municipality: Alacón

Area
  - Total: 47 km^{2} (18 sq mi)

Population (2025-01-01)
  - Total: 204
  - Density: 4.3/km^{2} (11/sq mi)
- Time zone: UTC+1 (CET)
  - Summer (DST): UTC+2 (CEST)

Alacón is a municipality located in the province of Teruel, Aragon, Spain. According to the 2004 census (INE), the municipality had a population of 470 inhabitants, and is at an altitude of 704 meters (2,310 ft).

The village has a military tower called “Torre de los Moros”. The tower was built by the Moors and is square with a pyramidal front elevation. It dates to the Reconquista and is one of the oldest towers in the province.

The 18th-century parish church is dedicated to the Assumption. It has three naves and a dome which has pendentives with bas-relief decoration. The 16th century gothic-renaissance style hermitage dedicated to El Calvario (Calvary) and the restored 17th century hermitage dedicated to San Miguel (St. Michael) are found on a promontory.

The town produces olives which are used to make an olive oil which has a special guarantee of quality and origin.

== Paleontological Discovery Centre ==
The Paleontological Discovery Centre is a museum of Mousterian culture, characteristic of the mid-Paleolithic period (between 50,000 and 35,000 BCE).

The Covacho de Eudoviges archaeological site is found at the top of a ravine which runs into the river Martín. It was excavated in 1969-70 and 670 flint tools, 50 ferrite cores and nearly 10,000 stone chips and other objects including the waste materials from tool making and Musterian spearheads were found. The chemical composition of the soil has destroyed most of the fossils and bones which should have been left in the places where the prehistoric settlers ate. Bone remains which have been identified include a rhinoceros from the period mentioned, a prehistoric horse and an animal belonging to the deer family, probably a buck, from the mid to late pleistocene period.

Pottery from the nomads in the late Neolithic or early Bronze Age was also found.

== See also ==
- List of municipalities in Teruel
