= Estercuel =

- municipality
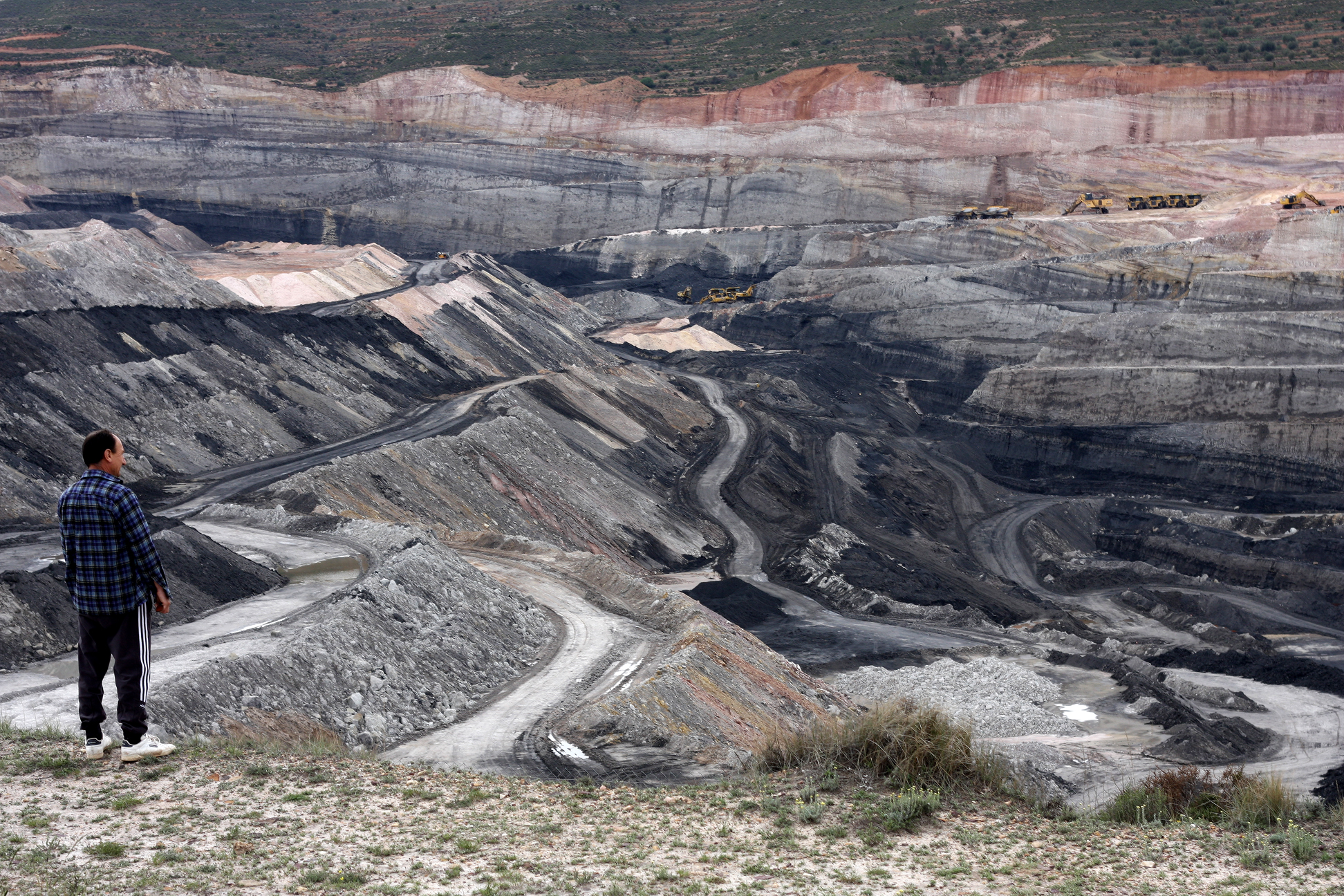
- Coal mine in Estercuel

- Flag Coat of arms

- Location within Spain
- Coordinates: 40°51′N 0°38′W
- Country: Spain
- Autonomous community: Aragon
- Province: Teruel

Area
  - Total: 55 km^{2} (21 sq mi)
- Elevation: 829 m (2,720 ft)

Population (2025-01-01)
  - Total: 198
  - Density: 3.6/km^{2} (9.3/sq mi)
- Time zone: UTC+1 (CET)
  - Summer (DST): UTC+2 (CEST)

Estercuel is a municipality located in the province of Teruel, Aragon, Spain. According to the 2004 census (INE), the municipality has a population of 314 inhabitants.

== Geography ==
The municipality is situated at an altitude of 829 m (2,720 ft) above sea level, it has an area of 55.9 km^{2} (21.6 sq mi). The distance by road to Teruel is 120 kilometres (75 mi). It can be accessed by the N-420 / N-211. The town is located at the foothills of the Sierra de San Just, and not far from the Sierra de los Moros. The town is to the left of the Estercuel river, also called Zarzosa.

== See also ==
- List of municipalities in Teruel
