= Veguillas de la Sierra =

- municipality
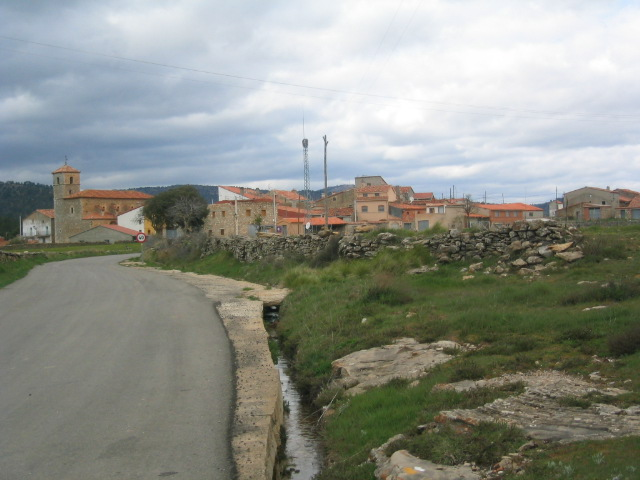

- Location within Spain
- Coordinates: 40°09′N 1°24′W
- Country: Spain
- Autonomous community: Aragon
- Province: Teruel
- Municipality: Veguillas de la Sierra

Area
  - Total: 13 km^{2} (5.0 sq mi)
- Elevation: 1,270 m (4,170 ft)

Population (2025-01-01)
  - Total: 27
  - Density: 2.1/km^{2} (5.4/sq mi)
- Time zone: UTC+1 (CET)
  - Summer (DST): UTC+2 (CEST)

Veguillas de la Sierra is a municipality located in the province of Teruel, Aragon, Spain. According to the 2018 census (INE), the municipality has a population of 20 inhabitants.

== See also ==
- List of municipalities in Teruel
