= La Cuba =

- municipality
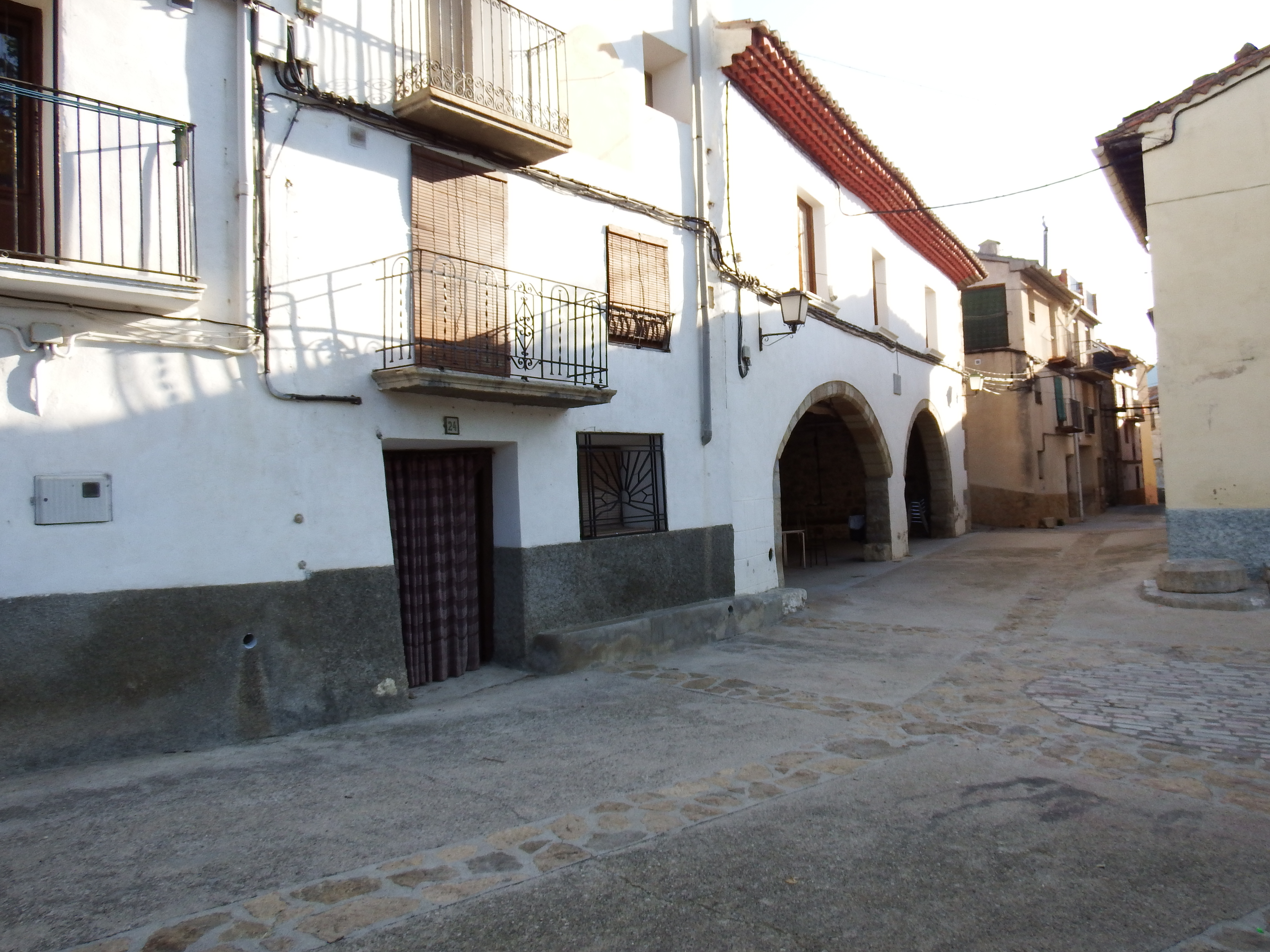

- Coat of arms

- Location within Spain
- Coordinates: 40°35′N 0°18′W
- Country: Spain
- Autonomous community: Aragon
- Province: Teruel

Area
  - Total: 6 km^{2} (2.3 sq mi)

Population (2025-01-01)
  - Total: 53
  - Density: 8.8/km^{2} (23/sq mi)
- Time zone: UTC+1 (CET)
  - Summer (DST): UTC+2 (CEST)

La Cuba is a municipality located in the province of Teruel, Aragon, Spain. According to the 2004 census (INE), the municipality has a population of 52 inhabitants.

== See also ==
- List of municipalities in Teruel
