= Cascante del Río =

Cascante del Río, Spain
- Flag Coat of arms

- Location within Spain
- Coordinates: 40°12′N 1°6′W
- Country: Spain
- Autonomous community: Aragon
- Province: Teruel
- Municipality: Cascante del Río

Area
  - Total: 32 km^{2} (12 sq mi)
- Elevation: 984 m (3,228 ft)

Population (2025-01-01)
  - Total: 73
  - Density: 2.3/km^{2} (5.9/sq mi)
- Time zone: UTC+1 (CET)
  - Summer (DST): UTC+2 (CEST)

Cascante del Río is a municipality located in the province of Teruel, Aragon, Spain. According to the 2018 census (INE), the municipality has a population of 71 inhabitants.

== See also ==
- List of municipalities in Teruel
