= Valdecuenca =

- municipality
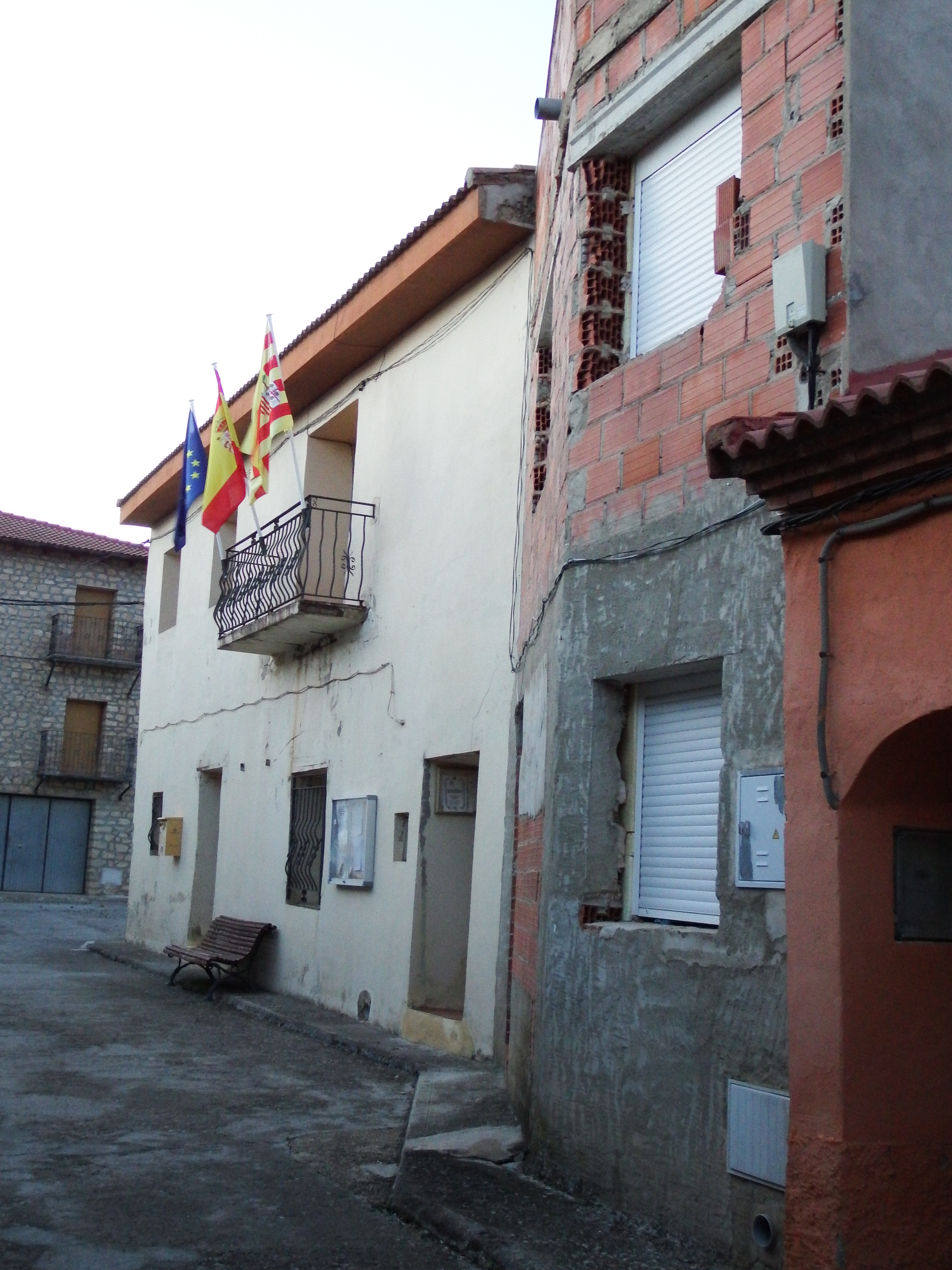
- Town hall

- Location within Spain
- Coordinates: 40°18′N 1°24′W
- Country: Spain
- Autonomous community: Aragon
- Province: Teruel
- Municipality: Valdecuenca

Area
  - Total: 18.72 km^{2} (7.23 sq mi)
- Elevation: 1,331 m (4,367 ft)

Population (2025-01-01)
  - Total: 33
  - Density: 1.8/km^{2} (4.6/sq mi)
- Time zone: UTC+1 (CET)
  - Summer (DST): UTC+2 (CEST)

Valdecuenca is a municipality located in the province of Teruel, Aragon, Spain. According to the 2004 census (INE), the municipality had a population of 43 inhabitants.

== See also ==
- List of municipalities in Teruel
