= Aguatón =

Aguatón, Spain
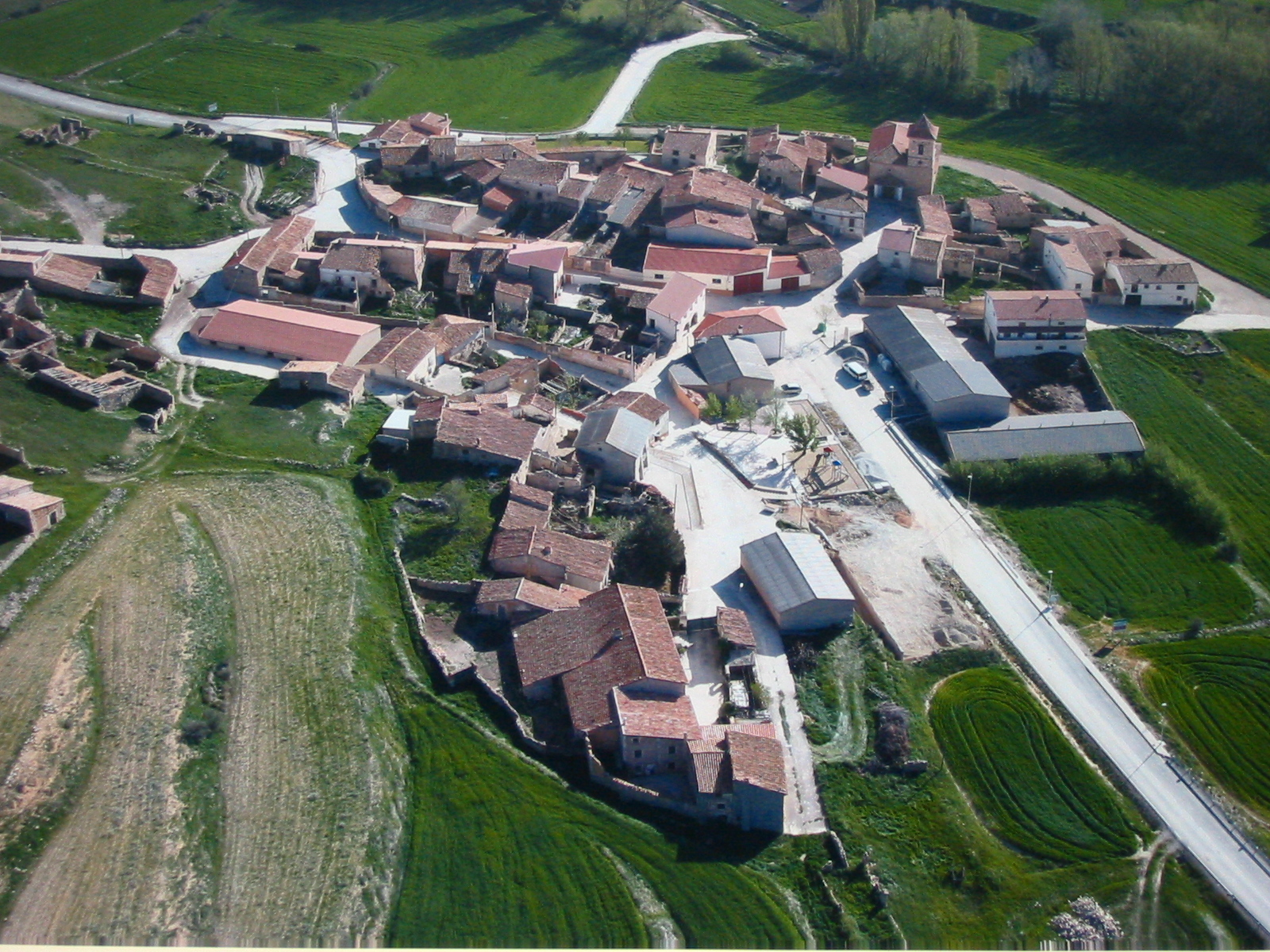
- Aerial view

- Flag Coat of arms

- Location within Spain
- Coordinates: 40°40′N 1°14′W
- Country: Spain
- Autonomous community: Aragon
- Province: Teruel
- Municipality: Aguatón

Area
  - Total: 21.64 km^{2} (8.36 sq mi)
- Elevation: 1,225 m (4,019 ft)

Population (2025-01-01)
  - Total: 18
  - Density: 0.83/km^{2} (2.2/sq mi)
- Time zone: UTC+1 (CET)
  - Summer (DST): UTC+2 (CEST)

Aguatón is a municipality in the province of Teruel, Aragon, Spain. According to the 2018 census (INE), the municipality had a population of 18 inhabitants.

== See also ==
- List of municipalities in Teruel
