= Corbalán =

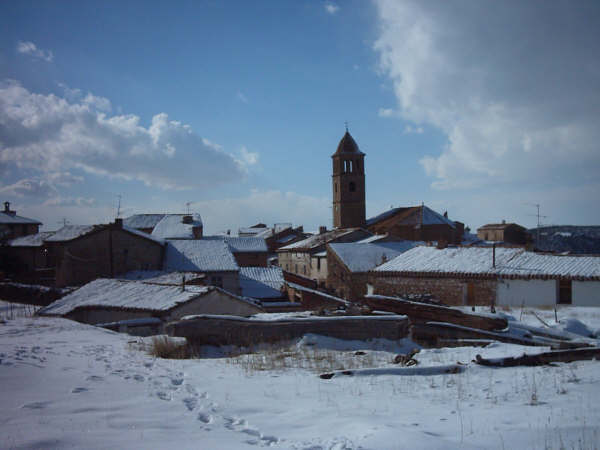

- Coat of arms

- Location of Corbalán Corbalán (Spain)
- Coordinates: 40°24′N 0°59′W
- Country: Spain
- Autonomous community: Aragon
- Province: Teruel
- Municipality: Corbalán

Area
  - Total: 82 km^{2} (32 sq mi)

Population (2025-01-01)
  - Total: 117
  - Density: 1.4/km^{2} (3.7/sq mi)
- Time zone: UTC+1 (CET)
  - Summer (DST): UTC+2 (CEST)

Corbalán is a municipality located in the province of Teruel, Aragon, Spain. According to the 2018 census (INE), the municipality has a population of 109 inhabitants.

== See also ==
- List of municipalities in Teruel
