= Torrijas =

- municipality
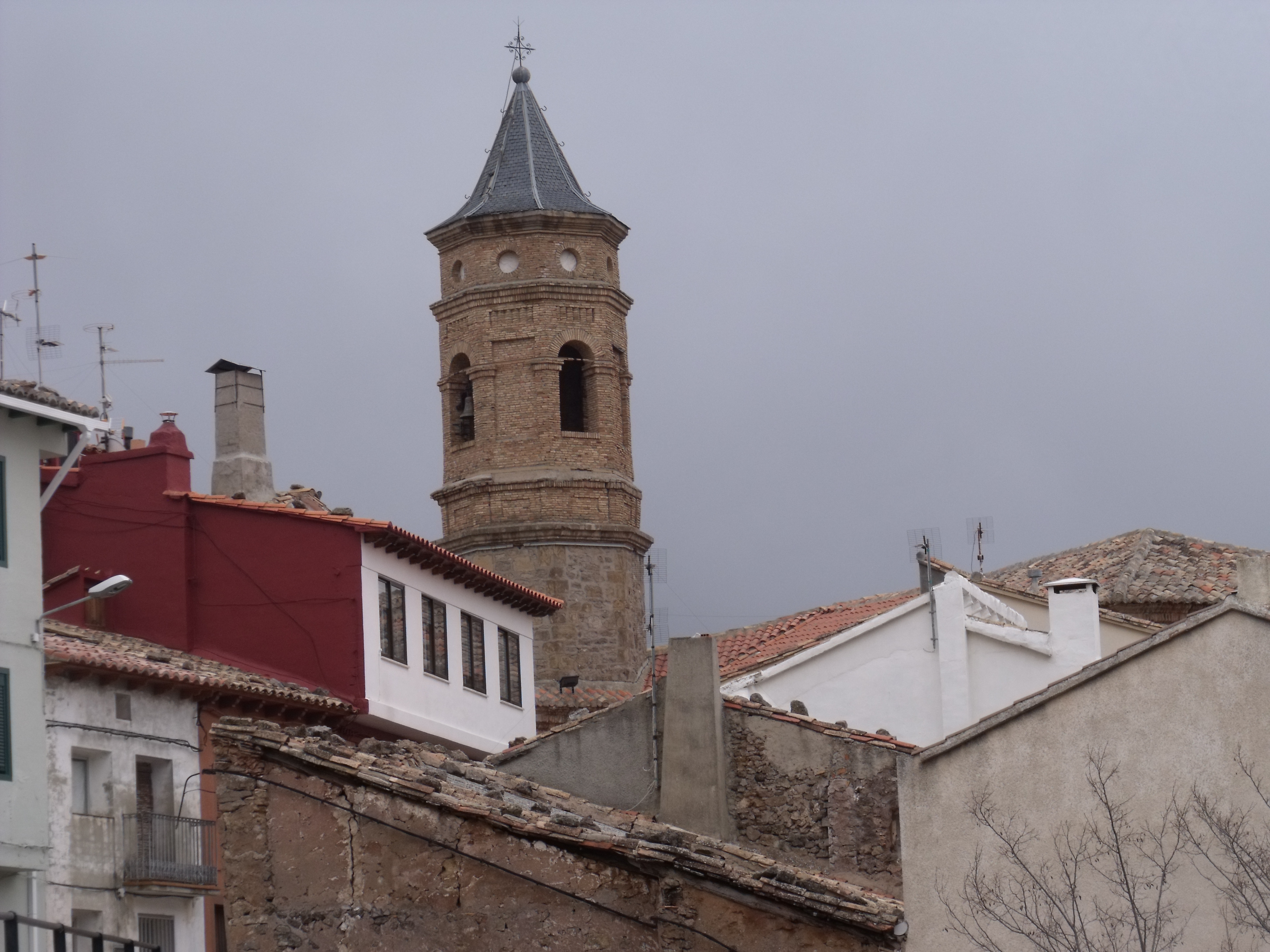

- Flag Coat of arms

- Location within Spain
- Coordinates: 40°1′N 0°57′W
- Country: Spain
- Autonomous community: Aragon
- Province: Teruel

Area
  - Total: 57.34 km^{2} (22.14 sq mi)

Population (2025-01-01)
  - Total: 36
  - Density: 0.63/km^{2} (1.6/sq mi)
- Time zone: UTC+1 (CET)
  - Summer (DST): UTC+2 (CEST)

Torrijas is a municipality located in the province of Teruel, Aragon, Spain. According to the 2004 census (INE), the municipality has a population of 87 inhabitants.

This village stands very close to the ski resort in the Javalambre mountains. The local fiesta mayor takes place on the weekend nearest to August the 10th. A second fiesta is held on the 3rd weekend of September, featuring bullfights, fire bulls, evening dances, activities for children and popular meals.

== See also ==
- List of municipalities in Teruel
