= Torrecilla de Alcañiz =

Torrecilla de Alcañiz, Spain
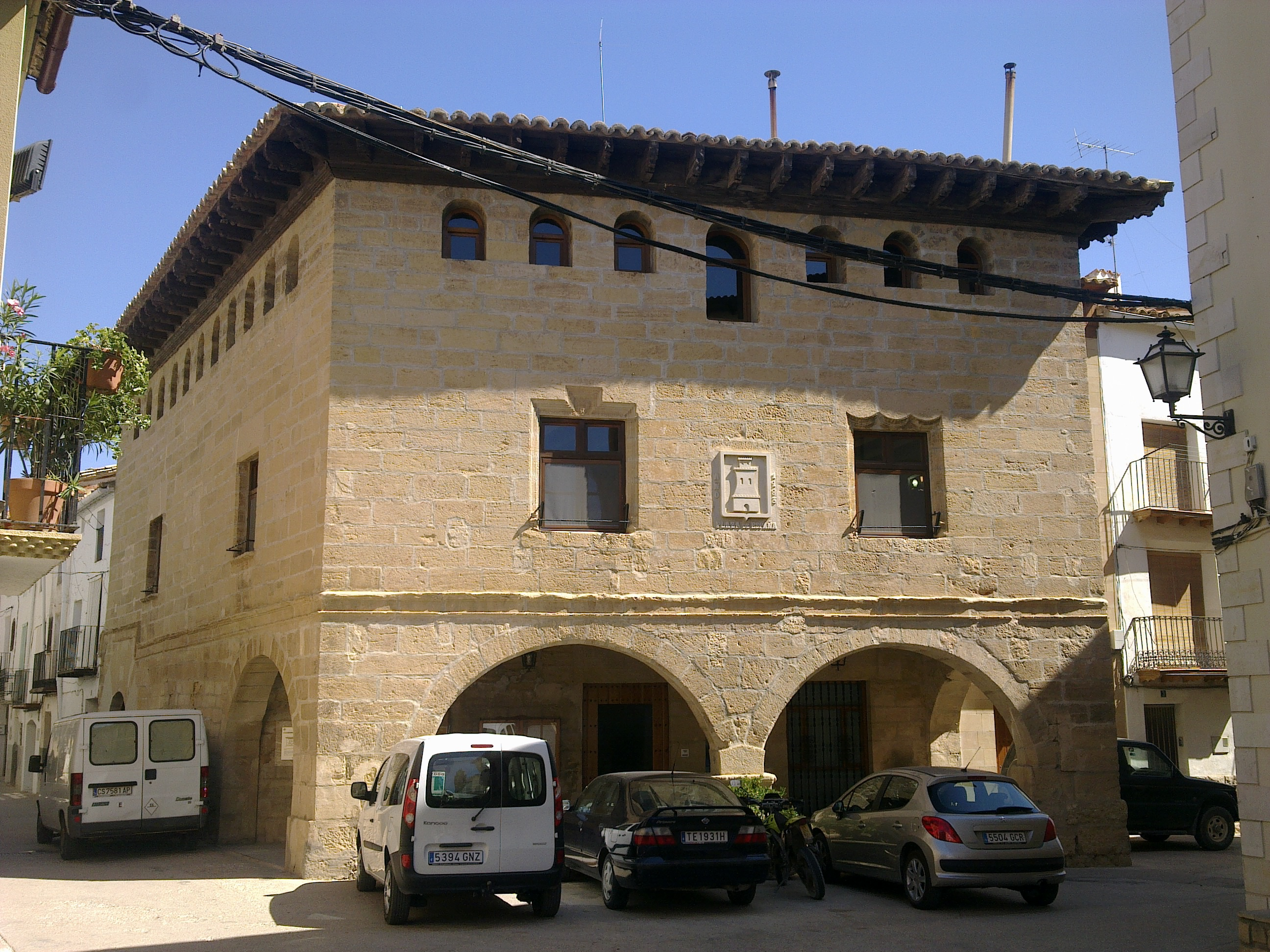

- Coat of arms

- Location within Spain
- Coordinates: 40°58′N 0°5′W
- Country: Spain
- Autonomous community: Aragon
- Province: Teruel
- Municipality: Torrecilla de Alcañiz

Area
  - Total: 26 km^{2} (10 sq mi)
- Elevation: 446 m (1,463 ft)

Population (2025-01-01)
  - Total: 436
  - Density: 17/km^{2} (43/sq mi)
- Time zone: UTC+1 (CET)
  - Summer (DST): UTC+2 (CEST)

Torrecilla de Alcañiz is a municipality located in the province of Teruel, Aragon, Spain. According to the 2004 census (INE), the municipality has a population of 462 inhabitants.

== See also ==
- List of municipalities in Teruel
