= Palomar de Arroyos =

- municipality
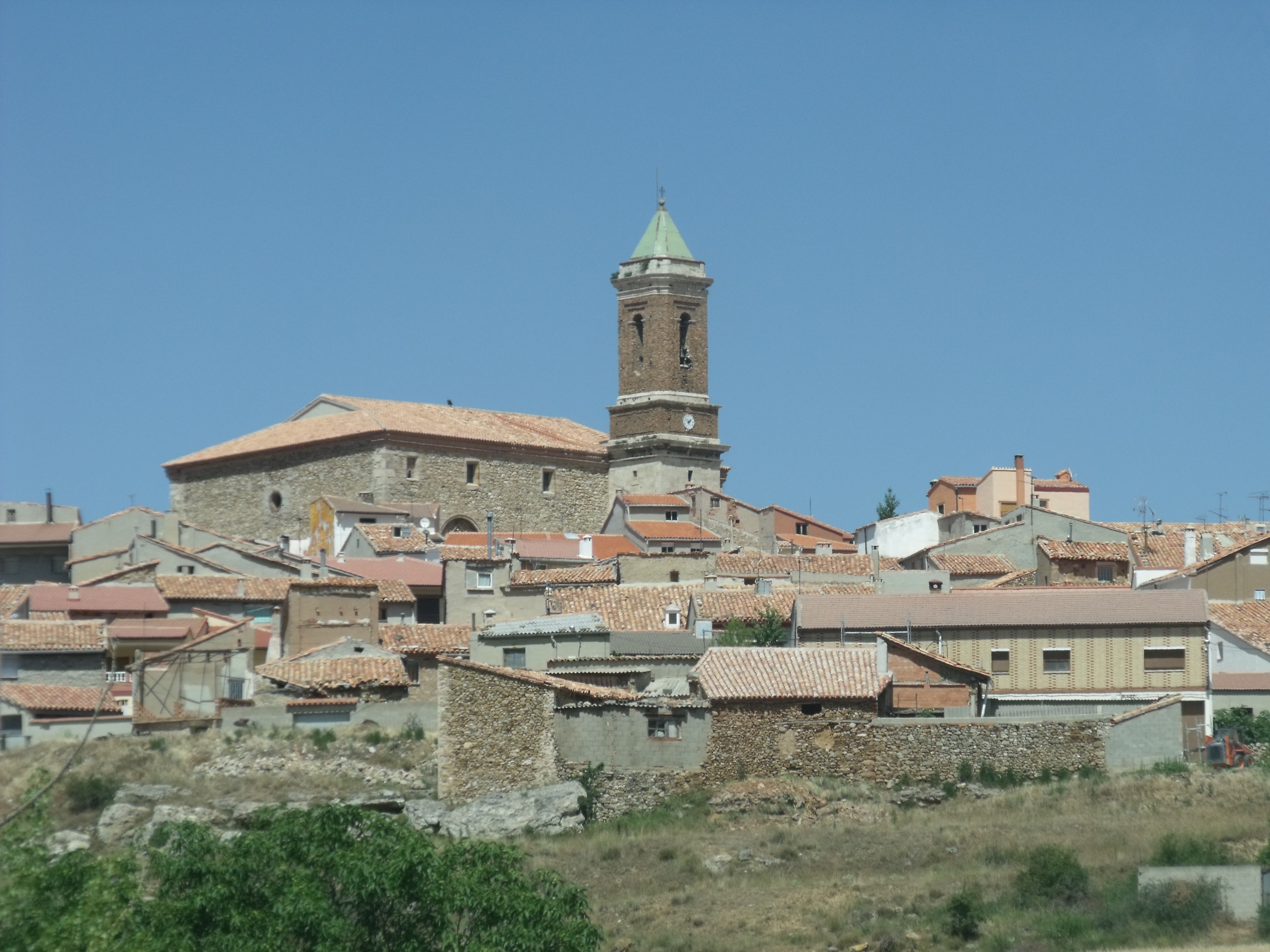

- Coat of arms

- Location within Spain
- Coordinates: 40°47′N 0°45′W
- Country: Spain
- Autonomous community: Aragon
- Province: Teruel
- Municipality: Palomar de Arroyos

Area
  - Total: 33 km^{2} (13 sq mi)
- Elevation: 1,206 m (3,957 ft)

Population (2025-01-01)
  - Total: 166
  - Density: 5.0/km^{2} (13/sq mi)
- Time zone: UTC+1 (CET)
  - Summer (DST): UTC+2 (CEST)
- Website: www.palomardearroyos.es

Palomar de Arroyos is a municipality located in the province of Teruel, Aragon, Spain. According to the 2004 census (INE), the municipality has a population of 227 inhabitants.

== See also ==
- List of municipalities in Teruel
