= Nogueruelas =

- municipality
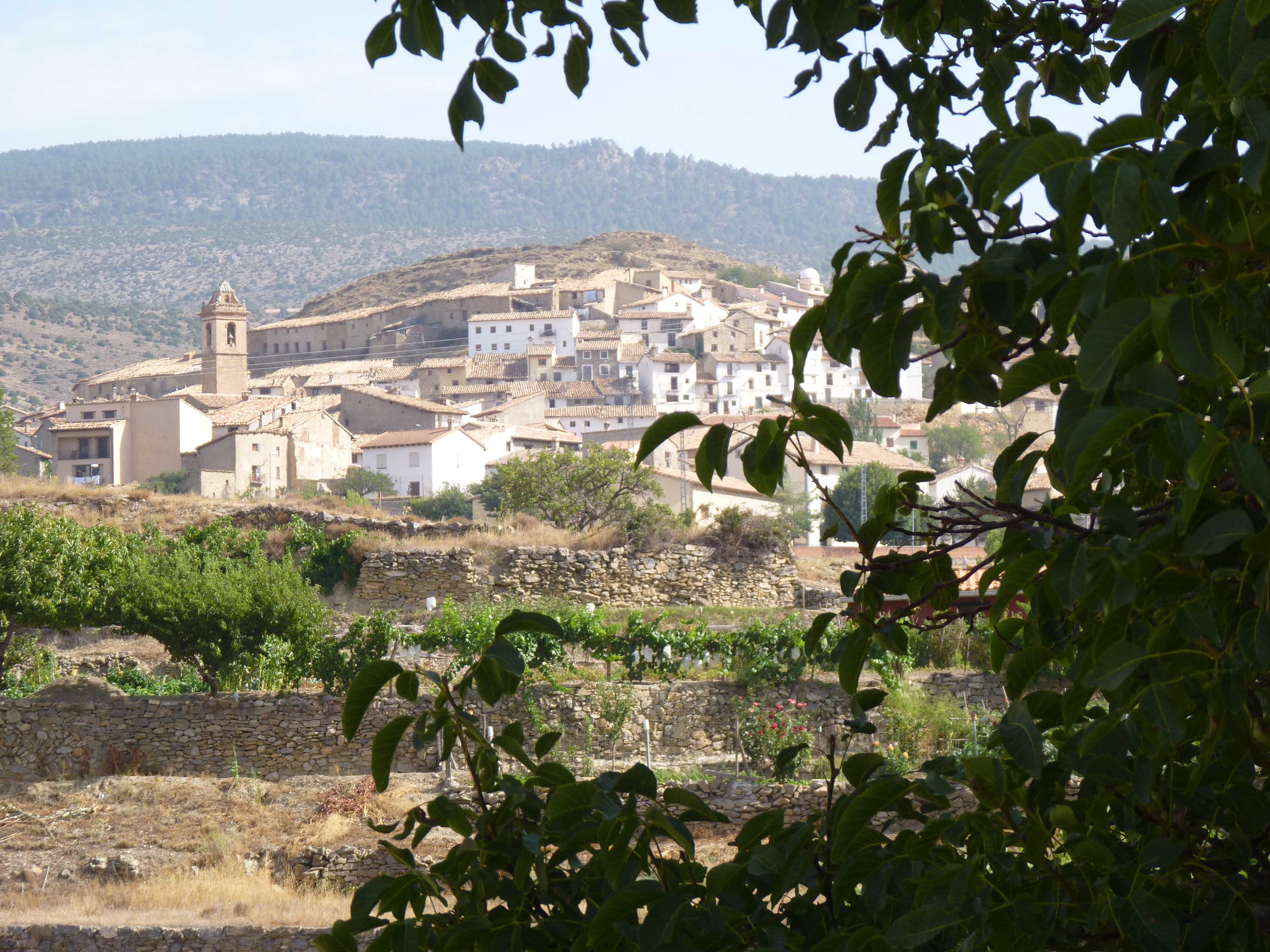

- Coat of arms

- Location within Spain
- Coordinates: 40°14′N 0°38′W
- Country: Spain
- Autonomous community: Aragon
- Province: Teruel
- Municipality: Nogueruelas

Area
  - Total: 99.5 km^{2} (38.4 sq mi)
- Elevation: 1,146 m (3,760 ft)

Population (2025-01-01)
  - Total: 188
  - Density: 1.89/km^{2} (4.89/sq mi)
- Time zone: UTC+1 (CET)
  - Summer (DST): UTC+2 (CEST)

Nogueruelas is a municipality located in the province of Teruel, Aragon, Spain. According to the 2004 census (INE), the municipality had a population of 227 inhabitants.

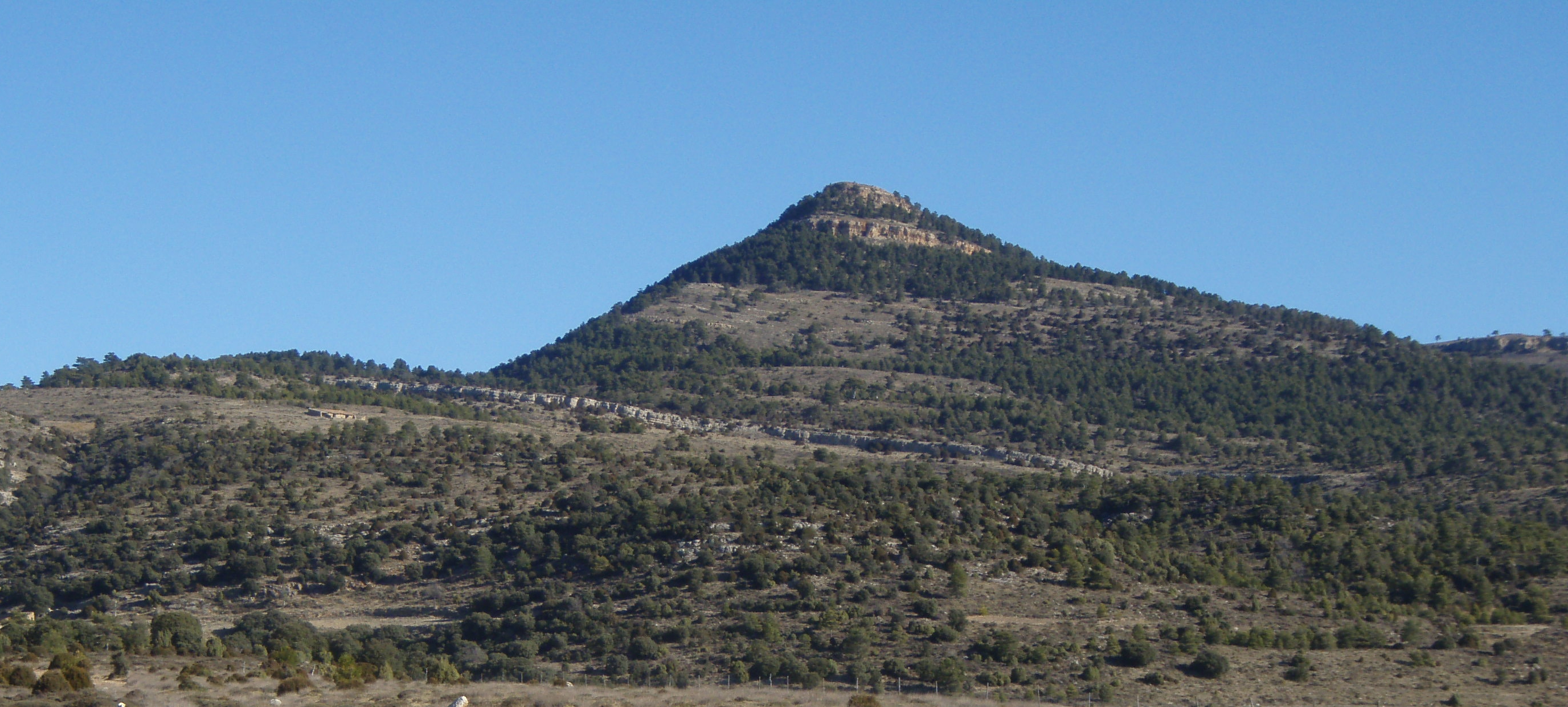
The Cabezo de las Cruces, a 1,710 m high summit located close to Nogueruelas

== See also ==
- List of municipalities in Teruel
