= Orrios =

- municipality
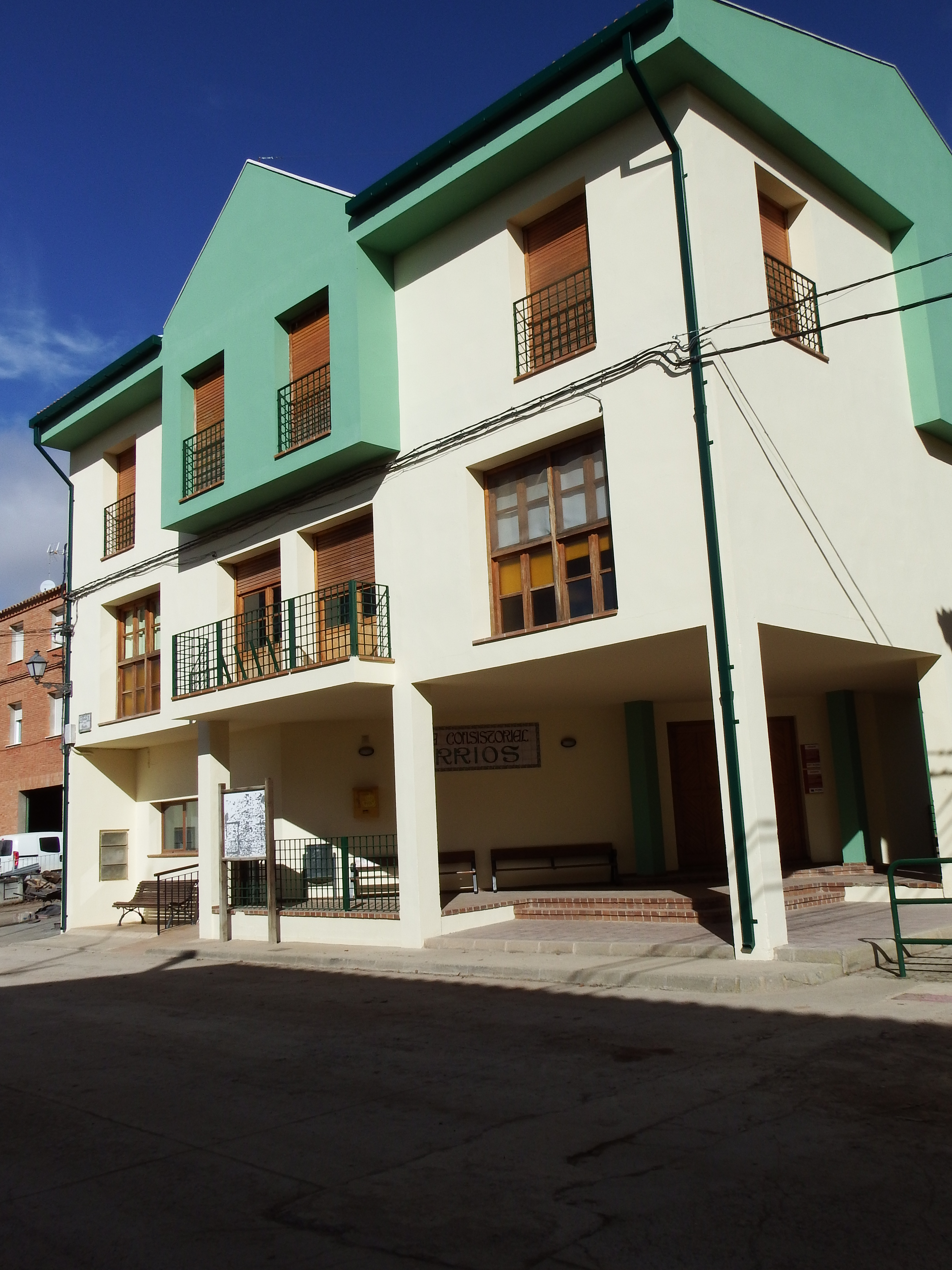
- Town hall

- Flag Coat of arms

- Location within Spain
- Coordinates: 40°35′N 0°59′W
- Country: Spain
- Autonomous community: Aragon
- Province: Teruel
- Municipality: Orrios

Area
  - Total: 44 km^{2} (17 sq mi)

Population (2025-01-01)
  - Total: 112
  - Density: 2.5/km^{2} (6.6/sq mi)
- Time zone: UTC+1 (CET)
  - Summer (DST): UTC+2 (CEST)

Orrios is a municipality located in the province of Teruel, Aragon, Spain. According to the 2018 census (INE), the municipality has a population of 126 inhabitants.

== See also ==
- List of municipalities in Teruel
