= Torrijo del Campo =

Torrijo del Campo, Spain
- Flag Coat of arms

- Location within Spain
- Coordinates: 40°50′N 1°20′W
- Country: Spain
- Autonomous community: Aragon
- Province: Teruel
- Comarca: Jiloca

Area
  - Total: 43 km^{2} (17 sq mi)
- Elevation: 923 m (3,028 ft)

Population (2025-01-01)
  - Total: 501
  - Density: 12/km^{2} (30/sq mi)
- Time zone: UTC+1 (CET)
  - Summer (DST): UTC+2 (CEST)

Torrijo del Campo is a municipality located in the province of Teruel, Aragon, Spain. According to the 2018 census (INE), the municipality has a population of 447 inhabitants.

== History ==
It was named Torrijos between 1495 and 1646, later being renamed Torrijo from 1713 to 1797, and adding del Campo from 1834. The placename derives from Latin, and means 'turret', which could mean that it was a border surveillance post in the various conflicts between the Crown of Aragon and the Crown of Castile.

Torrijo belonged to the sesma of the Jiloca river in the Community of Villages of Daroca and was recorded in the Archpriesthood of Daroca by 1280. It was assigned to Sobrecullida, Vereda and Corregimiento of Daroca at different times, being a village until 1711, a place in 1785 and a town belonging to the partido judicial of Calamocha since 1834.

The archaeological works carried out in the area confirmed the presence of ancient cultures, as in the case of Cerro del Moro, an area that was used as an old cemetery and where some pottery has been found. This oval-shaped settlement conserves as its only remnant a hollow in the rock that was possibly used as a cistern.

Archaeological remains have also been found in the area of the Eras where fragments of Iberian pottery were found, in the Masada area where medieval pottery was found or in the Iberian site of La Balseta. In addition, in 1996 a bronze plaque with an Iberian inscription was found on the road to Huertos Altos, which is called the Bronze of Torrijo. This finding was deposited for study at the Teruel Museum.

Another archaeological site of note is the uninhabited Villaverde, an Iberian town where fragments of Roman and medieval pottery have been found.

In addition, between Torrijo and Monreal del Campo there was a medieval town called Villacadima, of which several buildings are preserved including the stone markers that delimited it and on which its name is engraved. Villacadima was a stately place, belonging to the Catalan de Ocón family, which was not subject to royal or community law. For this reason, it often served as a refuge for criminals in the area. In 1311, and after the acquisition order of King James II, it was incorporated into the Community of Villages of Daroca. There is evidence that in the 14th century Villacadima had already disappeared, so its terms passed to the municipality of Monreal.

== Economy ==
After the gradual disappearance of saffron crops, which in Torrijo del Campo had great importance not only economically but also traditionally, its inhabitants mainly focus their activity on rainfed cereal agriculture and some irrigated orchards, meadows and forest areas. Livestock farming is also important, with a large number of pig, sheep, beef and rabbit farms. In addition, the nearby towns of Calamocha and Monreal del Campo are the labor destination for residents of Torrijo, who thus complement the household finances.

== Municipal symbols ==
When Miguel Ángel Meléndez was mayor, the Torrijo City Council initiated a process for the adoption of a municipal coat of arms and flag that culminated with the authorization by the Government of Aragon through Decree 100/1997, of 10 June, to adopt them.

According to this decree, the coat of arms should have the following form: "a rectangular coat of arms in vert, bearing a golden tower with a circular base, embattled in sable and clarified in azure; a silver base, bearing two escutcheons with the Royal Sign of Aragon and on the bottom two others, full azure. The crest, an open Royal Crown".

For its part, the flag must be "blue cloth, 2/3 proportion, with an escutcheon of the Royal Sign of Aragon at each of its corners; to the shaft a horizontal strip of 1/3 the length of the cloth with a yellow tower, with the door and the green windows placed inside a white rhombus".

== Heritage ==
- Catholic parish church of San Pedro, 18th century.
- Hermitage of San Fabián and San Sebastián. The old building was destroyed in the 15th century, and the modern one is from the 20th century.
- Hermitage of Santa Bárbara, from the early 20th century.

== Notable residents ==
Among the municipality's residents are figures such as Francisco Cabello Rubio, an Aragonese politician and jurist who held the position of Civil Governor in the provinces of Teruel, Castellón and Valencia until he was appointed Minister of the Interior in 1840.

Also in the political arena is Gabriel Campo Arpa, whose son José Campo Pérez was Mayor of Valencia. José was named Marquis of Campo by Alfonso XIII in 1875. Gabriel Campo Arpa's brother, Pedro Campo Arpa, was a military man who participated with the rank of colonel in the signing of the final act of the War of Independence of El Salvador. His son Rafael Campo Pomar became president of El Salvador.

Another famous resident of Torrijo del Campo is Friar León Villuendas Polo who was a professor of exegesis in Rome, attorney general in the Holy Land, Definitor General and President of the Pontifical Athenaeum of Rome. In 1944 he was appointed Bishop of Teruel.

Julián Torrijo Sánchez, another resident of Torrijo, was beatified in 2001 by Pope John Paul II.

There are singers such as José María Julve Terrado and Jesús Benito Rubio, or the blacksmith Antonio Edo Martín whose handicrafts have been exhibited in various exhibitions held at the Museum of Teruel in addition to being chosen in Barcelona for the exhibition of "Catalan Artists in Forge".

A descendant of Torrijo del Campo is the swimmer Teo Edo Farré, who participated in the 2000 Sydney Olympic Games where he ranked 24th in the 1500-meter freestyle.

In the academic world are Calixto Plumed Moreno, professor at the San Juan de Dios University School of Nursing and Physiotherapy; Julio Palacios Martínez, prominent scientist member of the Royal Spanish Society of Physics and Chemistry and the Royal Spanish Academy; Pascual Rubio, professor at the Department of Geography and Spatial Planning at the University of Zaragoza; and Francisco Gascón Latasa, professor of physics at the University of Seville.

== See also ==
- List of municipalities in Teruel
