= Losco =

Losco is an Italian surname. Notable people with the name include:

- Andrea Losco (born 1951), Italian politician and member of the European Parliament
- Ira Losco (born 1981), Maltese singer and competitor in the Eurovision Song Contest

== See also ==
- Loscos, Spanish municipality
