= Juan Francisco Marco y Catalán =

His Eminence Juan Francisco Marco y Catalán
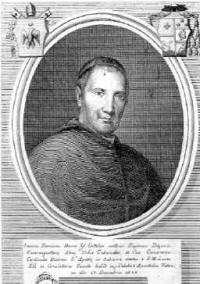
- Other post: Cardinal-deacon of Sant'Agata alla Suburra
- Previous posts: Vice-Chamberlain of the Holy Roman Church of the Reverend Apostolic Camera (1826–1828); Camerlengo of the Sacred College of Cardinals (1831–1832)

Orders
- Created cardinal: 15 December 1828 by Pope Leo XII
- Rank: Cardinal-deacon

Personal details
- Born: 24 October 1771 Bello, Aragón, Spain
- Died: 16 March 1841 (aged 69) Rome, Italy
- Denomination: Roman Catholic

Styles of Juan Francisco Marco y Catalán
- Reference style: His Eminence
- Spoken style: Your Eminence
- Informal style: Cardinal
- See: none

Juan Francisco Marco y Catalán was a Spanish Roman Catholic cardinal. He was born October 24, 1771, in Bello, Aragon, Spain.

== Cardinalate ==
On December 15, 1828, Juan was created cardinal deacon by Pope Leo XII. He was given the red hat on December 28 of the same year.

Catalán participated at the Papal conclave, 1829 which elected Pius VIII, and at the Papal conclave, 1830–1831 which elected Gregory XVI.

== Death ==
Catalán died on March 16, 1841. He was exposed in San Carlo ai Catinari church, Rome. He was buried with his deaconry.
