= Torralba de los Sisones =

- municipality
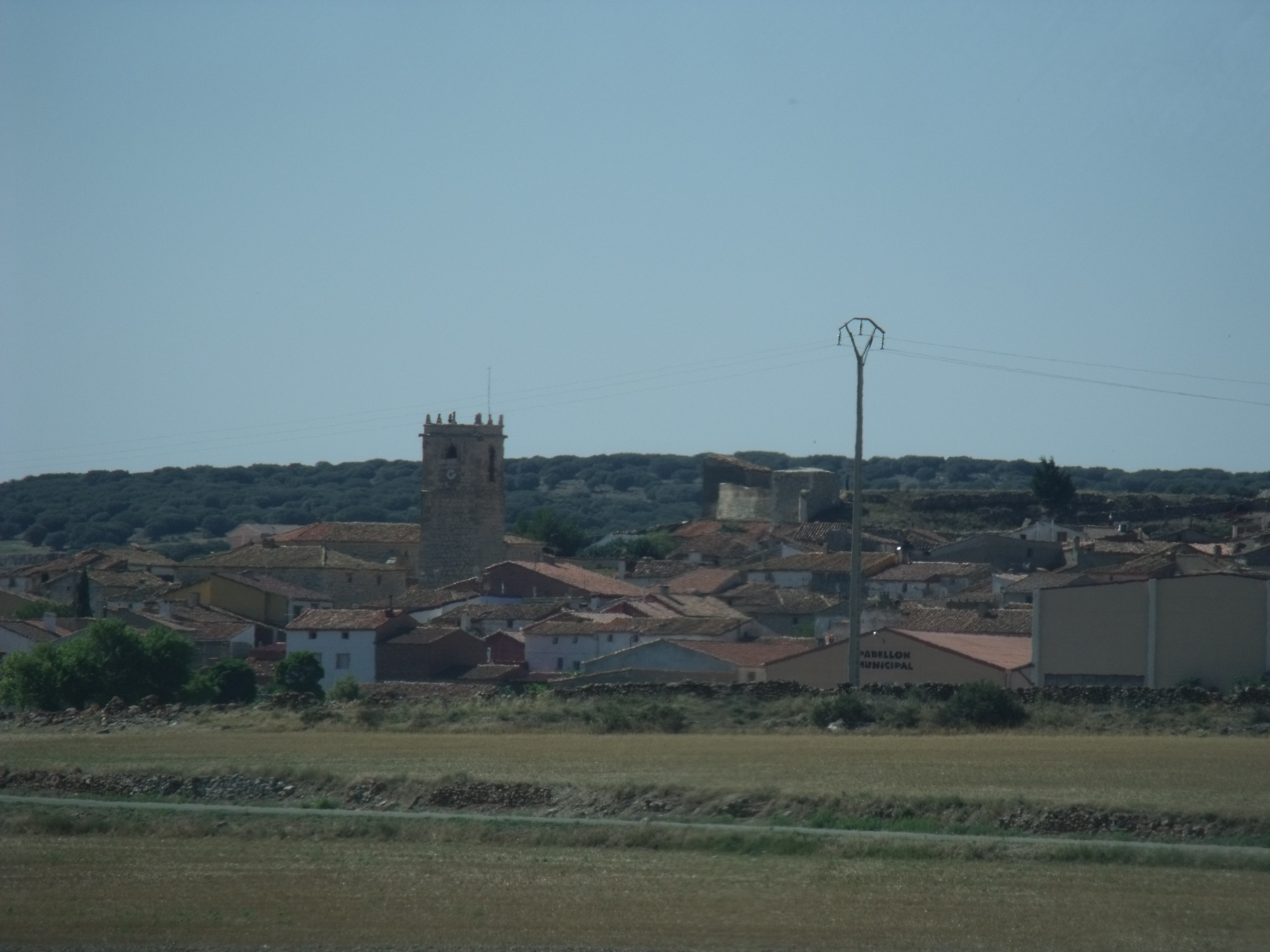

- Coat of arms

- Location within Spain
- Coordinates: 40°54′N 1°27′W
- Country: Spain
- Autonomous community: Aragon
- Province: Teruel
- Comarca: Jiloca

Area
  - Total: 44.66 km^{2} (17.24 sq mi)
- Elevation: 1,041 m (3,415 ft)

Population (2025-01-01)
  - Total: 145
  - Density: 3.25/km^{2} (8.41/sq mi)
- Time zone: UTC+1 (CET)
  - Summer (DST): UTC+2 (CEST)

Torralba de los Sisones is a municipality located in the province of Teruel, Aragon, Spain. According to the 2004 census (INE), the municipality had a population of 221 inhabitants.

== See also ==
- List of municipalities in Teruel
