= Santa Cruz de Nogueras =

- municipality
- Flag Coat of arms

- Location within Spain
- Coordinates: 41°7′N 1°5′W
- Country: Spain
- Autonomous community: Aragon
- Province: Teruel
- Comarca: Jiloca

Area
  - Total: 15 km^{2} (5.8 sq mi)
- Elevation: 894 m (2,933 ft)

Population (2025-01-01)
  - Total: 24
  - Density: 1.6/km^{2} (4.1/sq mi)
- Time zone: UTC+1 (CET)
  - Summer (DST): UTC+2 (CEST)

Santa Cruz de Nogueras is a municipality located in the province of Teruel, Aragon, Spain. According to the 2004 census (INE), the municipality has a population of 32 inhabitants.

== See also ==
- List of municipalities in Teruel
