= Burbáguena =

Burbáguena, Spain
- Coat of arms

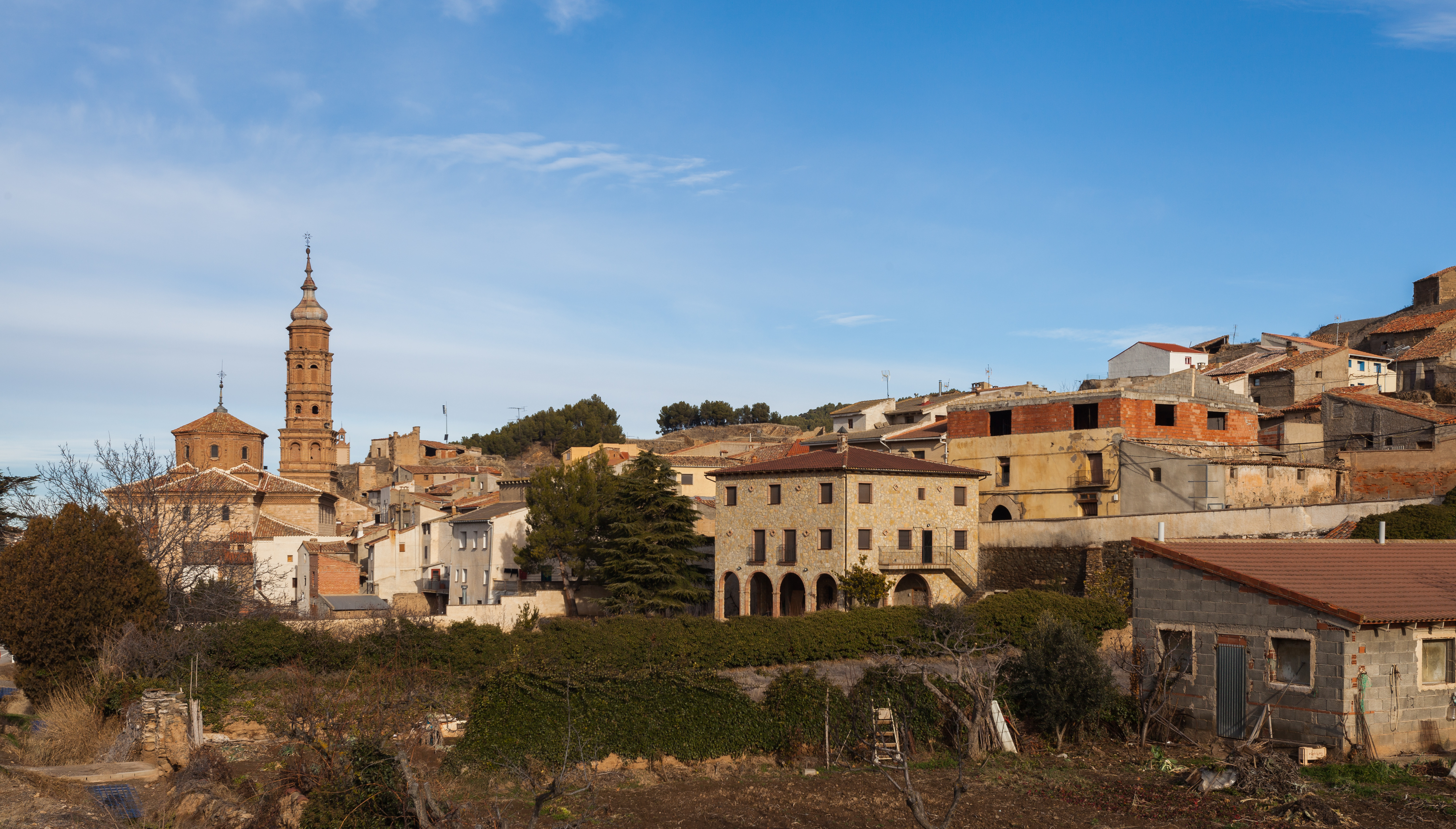
- Burbáguena

- Location within Spain
- Coordinates: 41°1′N 1°20′W
- Country: Spain
- Autonomous community: Aragon
- Province: Teruel
- Comarca: Jiloca Comarca

Area
  - Total: 38 km^{2} (15 sq mi)
- Elevation: 814 m (2,671 ft)

Population (2025-01-01)
  - Total: 396
  - Density: 10/km^{2} (27/sq mi)
- Time zone: UTC+1 (CET)
  - Summer (DST): UTC+2 (CEST)

Burbáguena is a municipality located in the province of Teruel, Aragon, Spain. According to the 2004 census (INE), the municipality has a population of 318 inhabitants.

== See also ==
- List of municipalities in Teruel
