= Caminreal =

Caminreal, Spain
- municipality
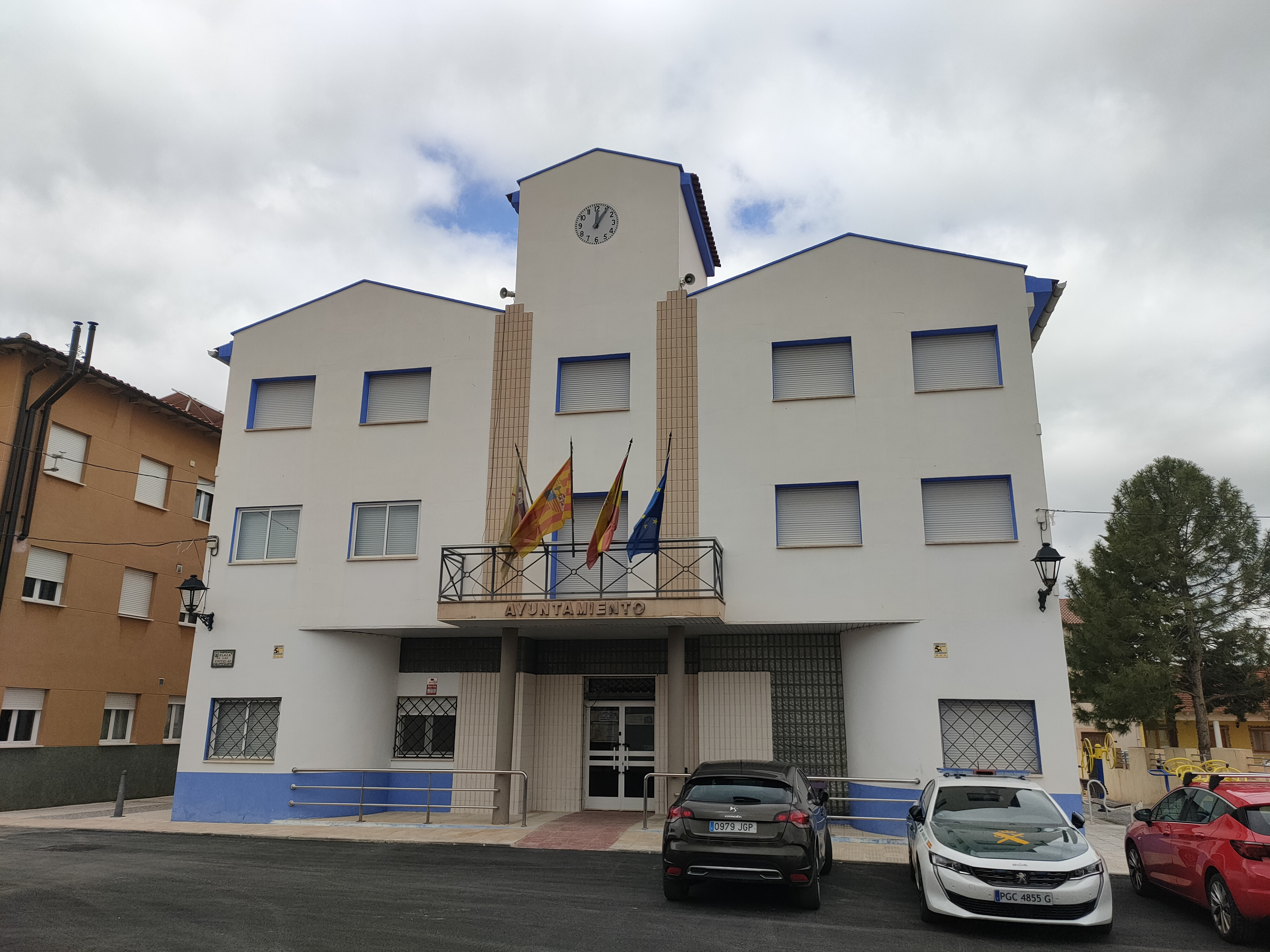
- Town hall

- Flag Coat of arms

- Location within Spain
- Coordinates: 40°50′N 1°19′W
- Country: Spain
- Autonomous community: Aragon
- Province: Teruel
- Comarca: Jiloca

Area
  - Total: 44.4 km^{2} (17.1 sq mi)
- Elevation: 920 m (3,020 ft)

Population (2025-01-01)
  - Total: 606
  - Density: 13.6/km^{2} (35.3/sq mi)
- Time zone: UTC+1 (CET)
  - Summer (DST): UTC+2 (CEST)

Caminreal is a municipality located in the province of Teruel, Aragon, Spain. According to the 2004 census (INE), the municipality had a population of 760 inhabitants.

== See also ==
- List of municipalities in Teruel
