= Province of Teruel =

Province of Spain

Province of Teruel Provincia de Teruel (Spanish), Província de Terol (Catalan)
- Province
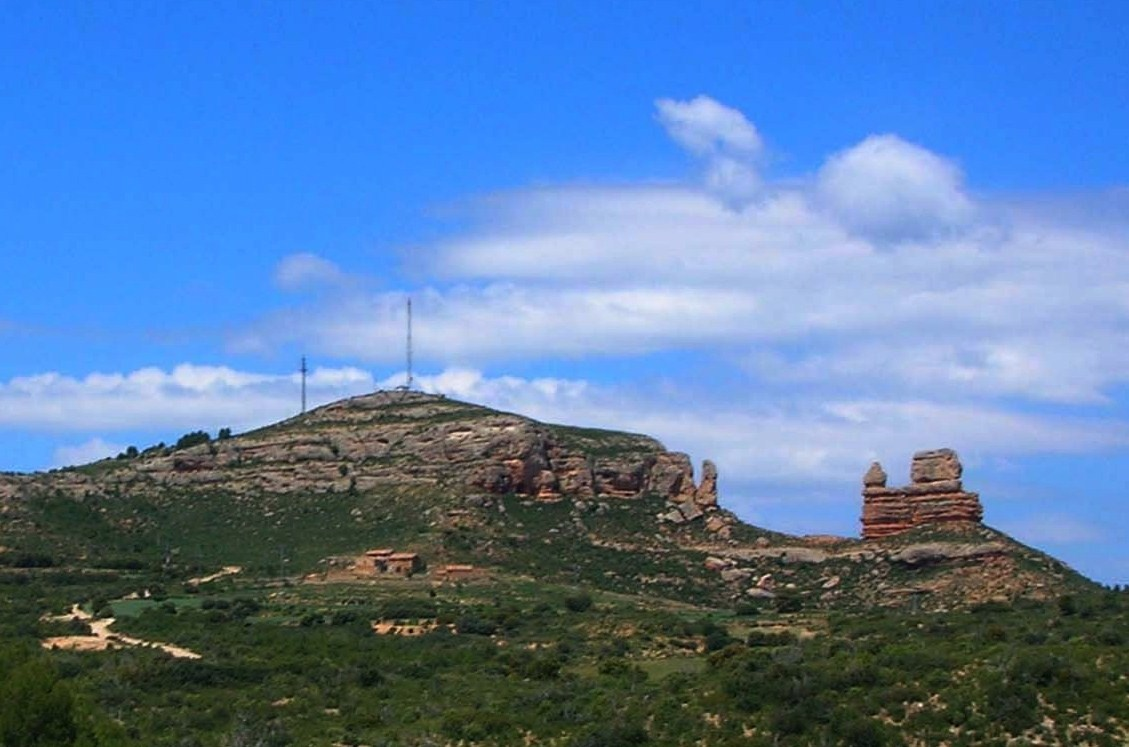
- The Sierra Carrascosa with the Guerrero Romano rock formation near Bordón

- Flag Coat of arms

- Location of the Province of Teruel in Spain
- Coordinates: 40°40′N 0°40′W
- Country: Spain
- Autonomous community: Aragon
- Capital: Teruel
- Municipalities: 236

Area
  - Total: 14,826.98 km^{2} (5,724.73 sq mi)
  - Rank: 10th in Spain
- 2.9% of Spain

Population (2025)
  - Total: 136,091
  - Rank: 49th in Spain
  - Density: 9.17861/km^{2} (23.7725/sq mi)
- Demonym: Turolense
- Time zone: UTC+1 (CET)
  - Summer (DST): UTC+2 (CEST)

The Province of Teruel (Spanish: Provincia de Teruel; Catalan: Província de Terol, [təˈɾɔl]) is a province of the autonomous community of Aragon in northeast Spain. The capital is the city of Teruel.

It is bordered by the provinces of Tarragona, Castellón, Valencia (including its exclave, Rincón de Ademuz), Cuenca, Guadalajara, and Zaragoza. Its population is 136,091 across an area of 14,826.98 square kilometres (5,724.73 sq mi), of whom about a quarter live in the capital, and its population density is 9.2/km^{2}. It contains 236 municipalities, of which more than half are villages of under 200 people. Teruel is the 2nd least populated province of Spain, and also the 2nd-lowest in population density, in both counts after the province of Soria.

The main language throughout the province is Spanish (with official status), although Catalan is spoken in a northeastern area bordering Catalonia.

== Geography ==
This province is located in the mountainous Iberian System. The main ranges in the province of Teruel are Sierra de la Virgen, Sierra de Santa Cruz, Sierra de Cucalón, Sierra de San Just, Sierra Carrascosa, Sierra Menera, Sierra Palomera, Sierra de Javalambre, Sierra de Gúdar, Sierra de Albarracín and the Montes Universales, among others.

== Comarcas ==
The following Comarcas of Aragon are located in Teruel:

- Bajo Martín
- Jiloca
- Cuencas Mineras
- Andorra-Sierra de Arcos
- Bajo Aragón
- Comunidad de Teruel
- Maestrazgo
- Sierra de Albarracín
- Gúdar-Javalambre
- Matarraña

== Municipalities ==
The province has 236 municipalities:

- Ababuj
- Abejuela
- Aguatón
- Aguaviva
- Aguilar del Alfambra
- Alacón
- Alba
- Albalate del Arzobispo
- Albarracín
- Albentosa
- Alcaine
- Alcalá de la Selva
- Alcañiz
- Alcorisa
- Alfambra
- Aliaga
- Allepuz
- Alloza
- Allueva
- Almohaja
- Alobras
- Alpeñés
- Anadón
- Andorra
- Arcos de las Salinas
- Arens de Lledó
- Argente
- Ariño
- Azaila
- Bádenas
- Báguena
- Bañón
- Barrachina
- Bea
- Beceite
- Bello
- Belmonte de San José
- Berge
- Bezas
- Blancas
- Blesa
- Bordón
- Bronchales
- Bueña
- Burbáguena
- Cabra de Mora
- Calaceite
- Calamocha
- Calanda
- Calomarde
- Camañas
- Camarena de la Sierra
- Camarillas
- Caminreal
- Cantavieja
- Cañada de Benatanduz
- La Cañada de Verich
- Cañada Vellida
- Cañizar del Olivar
- Cascante del Río
- Castejón de Tornos
- Castel de Cabra
- El Castellar
- Castellote
- Castelnou
- Castelserás
- Cedrillas
- Celadas
- Cella
- La Cerollera
- La Codoñera
- Corbalán
- Cortes de Aragón
- Cosa
- Cretas
- Crivillén
- La Cuba
- Cubla
- Cucalón
- El Cuervo
- Cuevas de Almudén
- Cuevas Labradas
- Ejulve
- Escorihuela
- Escucha
- Estercuel
- Ferreruela de Huerva
- Fonfría
- Formiche Alto
- Fórnoles
- Fortanete
- Foz-Calanda
- La Fresneda
- Frías de Albarracín
- Fuenferrada
- Fuentes Calientes
- Fuentes Claras
- Fuentes de Rubielos
- Fuentespalda
- Galve
- Gargallo
- Gea de Albarracín
- La Ginebrosa
- Griegos
- Guadalaviar
- Gúdar
- Híjar
- Hinojosa de Jarque
- La Hoz de la Vieja
- Huesa del Común
- La Iglesuela del Cid
- Jabaloyas
- Jarque de la Val
- Jatiel
- Jorcas
- Josa
- Lagueruela
- Lanzuela
- Libros
- Lidón
- Linares de Mora
- Lledó
- Loscos
- Maicas
- Manzanera
- Martín del Río
- Mas de las Matas
- La Mata de los Olmos
- Mazaleón
- Mezquita de Jarque
- Mirambel
- Miravete de la Sierra
- Molinos
- Monforte de Moyuela
- Monreal del Campo
- Monroyo
- Montalbán
- Monteagudo del Castillo
- Monterde de Albarracín
- Mora de Rubielos
- Moscardón
- Mosqueruela
- Muniesa
- Noguera de Albarracín
- Nogueras
- Nogueruelas
- Obón
- Odón
- Ojos Negros
- Olba
- Oliete
- Los Olmos
- Orihuela del Tremedal
- Orrios
- Palomar de Arroyos
- Pancrudo
- Las Parras de Castellote
- Peñarroya de Tastavins
- Peracense
- Peralejos
- Perales del Alfambra
- Pitarque
- Plou
- El Pobo
- La Portellada
- Pozondón
- Pozuel del Campo
- La Puebla de Híjar
- La Puebla de Valverde
- Puertomingalvo
- Ráfales
- Rillo
- Riodeva
- Ródenas
- Royuela
- Rubiales
- Rubielos de la Cérida
- Rubielos de Mora
- Salcedillo
- Saldón
- Samper de Calanda
- San Agustín
- San Martín del Río
- Santa Cruz de Nogueras
- Santa Eulalia del Campo
- Sarrión
- Segura de los Baños
- Seno
- Singra
- Terriente
- Teruel
- Toril y Masegoso
- Tormón
- Tornos
- Torralba de los Sisones
- Torre de Arcas
- Torre de las Arcas
- Torre del Compte
- Torre los Negros
- Torrecilla de Alcañiz
- Torrecilla del Rebollar
- Torrelacárcel
- Torremocha de Jiloca
- Torres de Albarracín
- Torrevelilla
- Torrijas
- Torrijo del Campo
- Tramacastiel
- Tramacastilla
- Tronchón
- Urrea de Gaén
- Utrillas
- Valacloche
- Valbona
- Valdealgorfa
- Valdecuenca
- Valdelinares
- Valdeltormo
- Valderrobres
- Valjunquera
- El Vallecillo
- Veguillas de la Sierra
- Villafranca del Campo
- Villahermosa del Campo
- Villanueva del Rebollar de la Sierra
- Villar del Cobo
- Villar del Salz
- Villarluengo
- Villarquemado
- Villarroya de los Pinares
- Villastar
- Villel
- Vinaceite
- Visiedo
- Vivel del Río Martín
- La Zoma

== Demographics ==
Historical population
Year	Pop.	±%
1842	181,661	—
1857	238,628	+31.4%
1877	248,765	+4.2%
1887	246,817	−0.8%
1900	251,994	+2.1%
1910	265,908	+5.5%
1920	264,062	−0.7%
1930	263,700	−0.1%
1940	245,960	−6.7%
1950	243,269	−1.1%
1960	223,758	−8.0%
1970	173,861	−22.3%
1981	153,457	−11.7%
1991	143,680	−6.4%
2001	135,858	−5.4%
2011	143,162	+5.4%
2021	134,259	−6.2%
Source: INE

As of 2026, the population is 136,091, of which 51.0% are male, and 49.0% are female. Minors make up 15.5% of the population, and seniors make up 24.7%.

Most of Teruel Province has undergone massive depopulation since the middle of the 20th century. This situation is shared with other areas in Spain, particularly with those near the Iberian System (much of the provinces of Soria, Guadalajara and Cuenca), and with other areas in Aragon.

The exodus from the rural mountain areas in Teruel rose after Francisco Franco's Plan de Estabilización in 1959. The population declined steeply as people migrated towards the industrial areas and large cities in Spain, leaving behind their small villages where living conditions were often harsh, with cold winters and very basic facilities.

As a consequence there are many ghost towns in different parts of the province.

A great number of surviving towns in Teruel have only a residual population, reviving somewhat during the summer when a few city-dwellers spend their holidays there. Other causes of the strong emigration are the low productivity of traditional agricultural practices, like sheep and goat farming, the closing of mines, like the large Sierra Menera mine near Ojos Negros, as well as the lifestyle changes that swept over rural Spain during the second half of the 20th century.

The Teruel Exists (Spanish: Teruel Existe) movement began at the turn of the 21st century. It is a platform of provincial authorities, institutions and sympathizers seeking to reverse the long-standing neglect of the province.

=== Immigration ===
As of 2025, immigrants make up 16.2% of the population. The 5 largest foreign countries of birth are Morocco, Romania, Colombia, Venezuela, and Cuba.

== Notable people ==
- Luis Buñuel, film director from Calanda
- Gaspar Sanz, music composer from Calanda
- Antón García Abril, music composer
- Pablo Serrano, sculptor from Crivillén
- Luis Milla, retired footballer who played for CD Teruel, FC Barcelona and Real Madrid
- David Civera, light music singer
- Federico Jiménez Losantos, author, journalist and radio host
- Manuel Pizarro Moreno, businessman, politician and jurist

== See also ==
- La Vaquilla del Ángel
- List of municipalities in Teruel
- Lower Aragon
- MotorLand Aragón
