= Torrecilla del Rebollar =

- municipality
- Flag Coat of arms

- Location within Spain
- Coordinates: 40°55′N 1°4′W
- Country: Spain
- Autonomous community: Aragon
- Province: Teruel
- Comarca: Jiloca

Area
  - Total: 63 km^{2} (24 sq mi)
- Elevation: 1,142 m (3,747 ft)

Population (2025-01-01)
  - Total: 114
  - Density: 1.8/km^{2} (4.7/sq mi)
- Time zone: UTC+1 (CET)
  - Summer (DST): UTC+2 (CEST)

Torrecilla del Rebollar is a municipality located in the province of Teruel, Aragon, Spain. According to the 2004 census (INE), the municipality has a population of 178 inhabitants.

It is located in the Sierra de Cucalón area.

== See also ==
- Jiloca Comarca
- List of municipalities in Teruel
