= Monforte de Moyuela =

Monforte
- Municipality
- Monforte de Moyuela
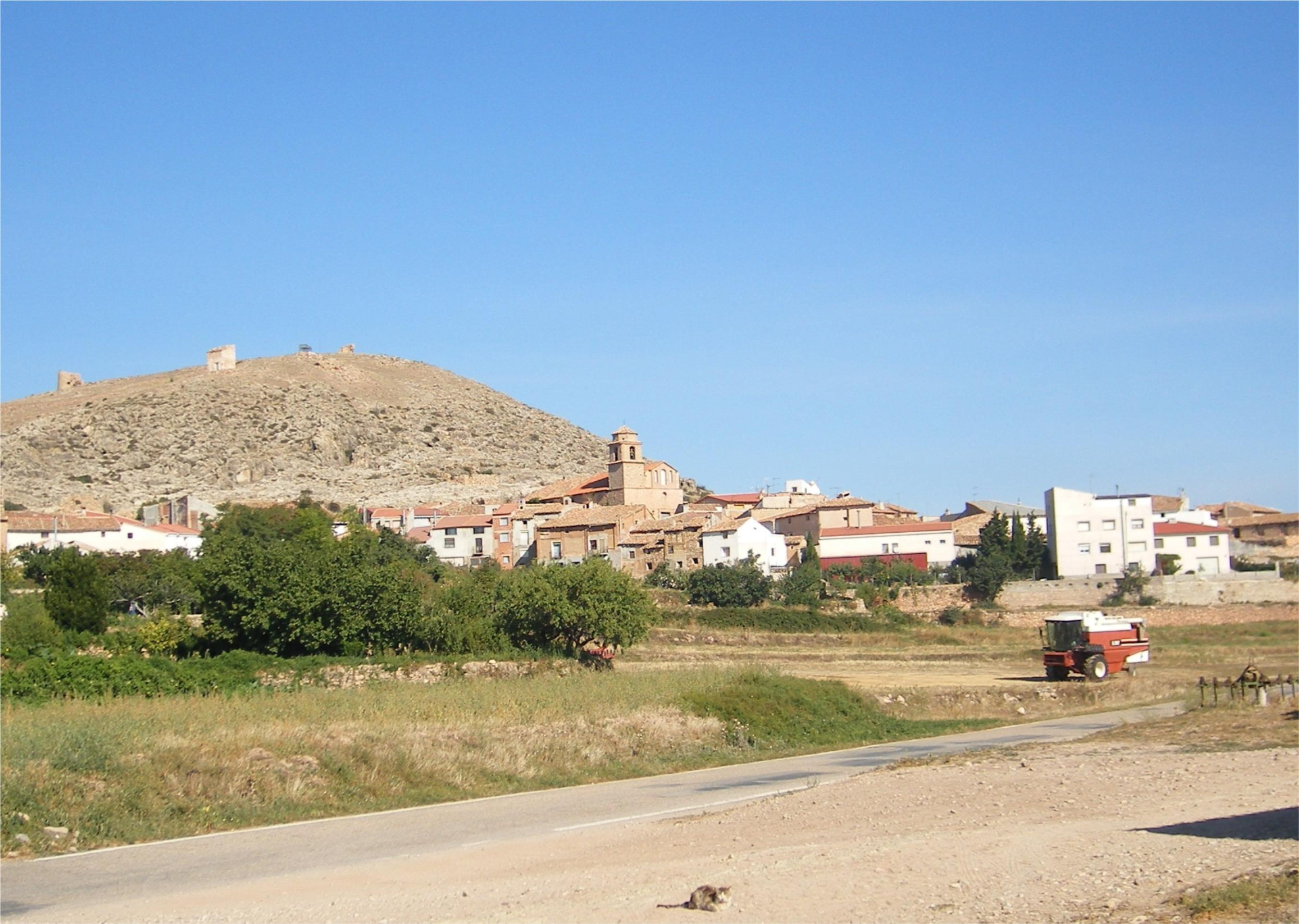

- Flag Coat of arms

- Location of Monforte de Moyuela. Monforte (Aragon)
- Coordinates: 41°3′N 1°1′W
- Country: Spain
- Autonomous community: Aragón
- Province: Teruel
- Comarca: Jiloca

Government
  - Alcalde: Paula Delmás Biel (2019) (People's Party)

Area
  - Total: 47.74 km^{2} (18.43 sq mi)
- Elevation: 1,008 m (3,307 ft)

Population (2023)
  - Total: 83
  - Density: 1.7/km^{2} (4.5/sq mi)
- Demonym(s): Monfortino (in Spanish); Montfortino (in Aragonese)
- Time zone: UTC+1 (CET)
  - Summer (DST): UTC+2 (CEST)
- Postal code: 44493
- Dialing code: (+34) 978 73...
- Website: www.monfortedemoyuela.es

Monforte de Moyuela is a town and municipality in Aragon, located in the comarca of Jiloca, in the province of Teruel. According to the 2023 continuous register (INE), the municipality has a population of 83 inhabitants, with an area of 47.74 km² and a density of 1.74.

The municipality is 121 kilometres from Teruel, the provincial capital.

== See also ==
- List of municipalities in Teruel
