= San Martín del Río =

- municipality
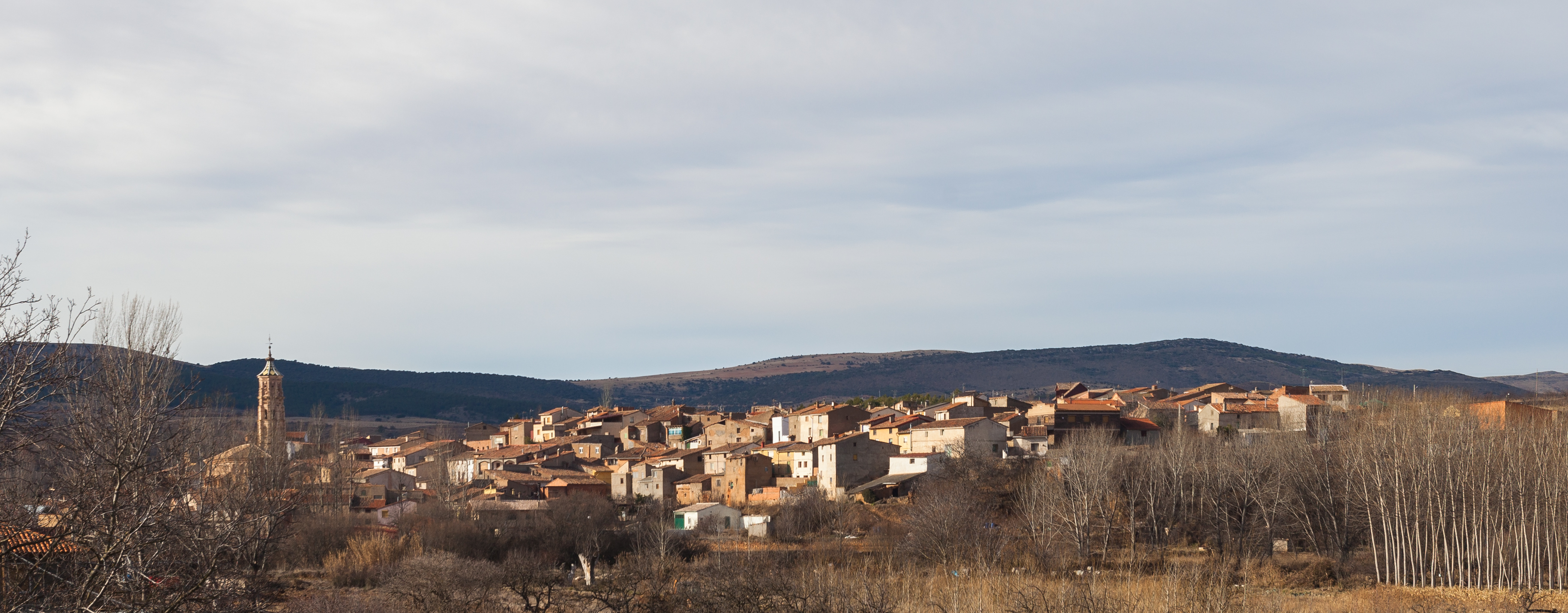

- Location within Spain
- Coordinates: 41°4′N 1°23′W
- Country: Spain
- Autonomous community: Aragon
- Province: Teruel
- Comarca: Jiloca Comarca

Area
  - Total: 16 km^{2} (6.2 sq mi)
- Elevation: 781 m (2,562 ft)

Population (2025-01-01)
  - Total: 135
  - Density: 8.4/km^{2} (22/sq mi)
- Time zone: UTC+1 (CET)
  - Summer (DST): UTC+2 (CEST)

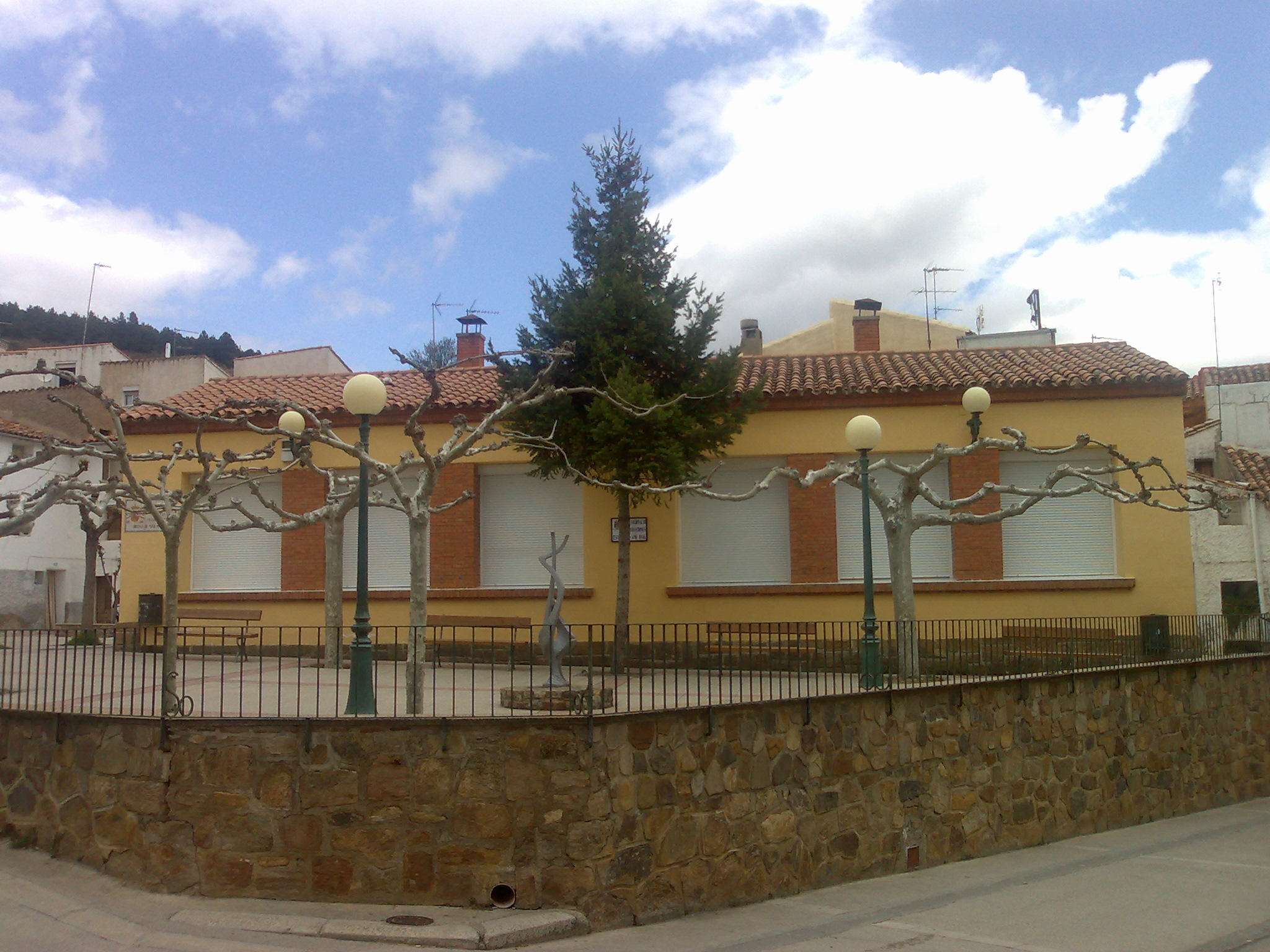
Main school in San Martín del Río

San Martín del Río is a municipality located in the province of Teruel, Aragon, Spain. According to the 2010 census the municipality has a population of 199 inhabitants.

San Martín del Río is located in the Jiloca Comarca. There are Bronze Age archaeological remains in nearby Cerro del Zorro site.

== See also ==
- Jiloca Comarca
- List of municipalities in Teruel
