= Báguena =

- municipality
- Flag Coat of arms

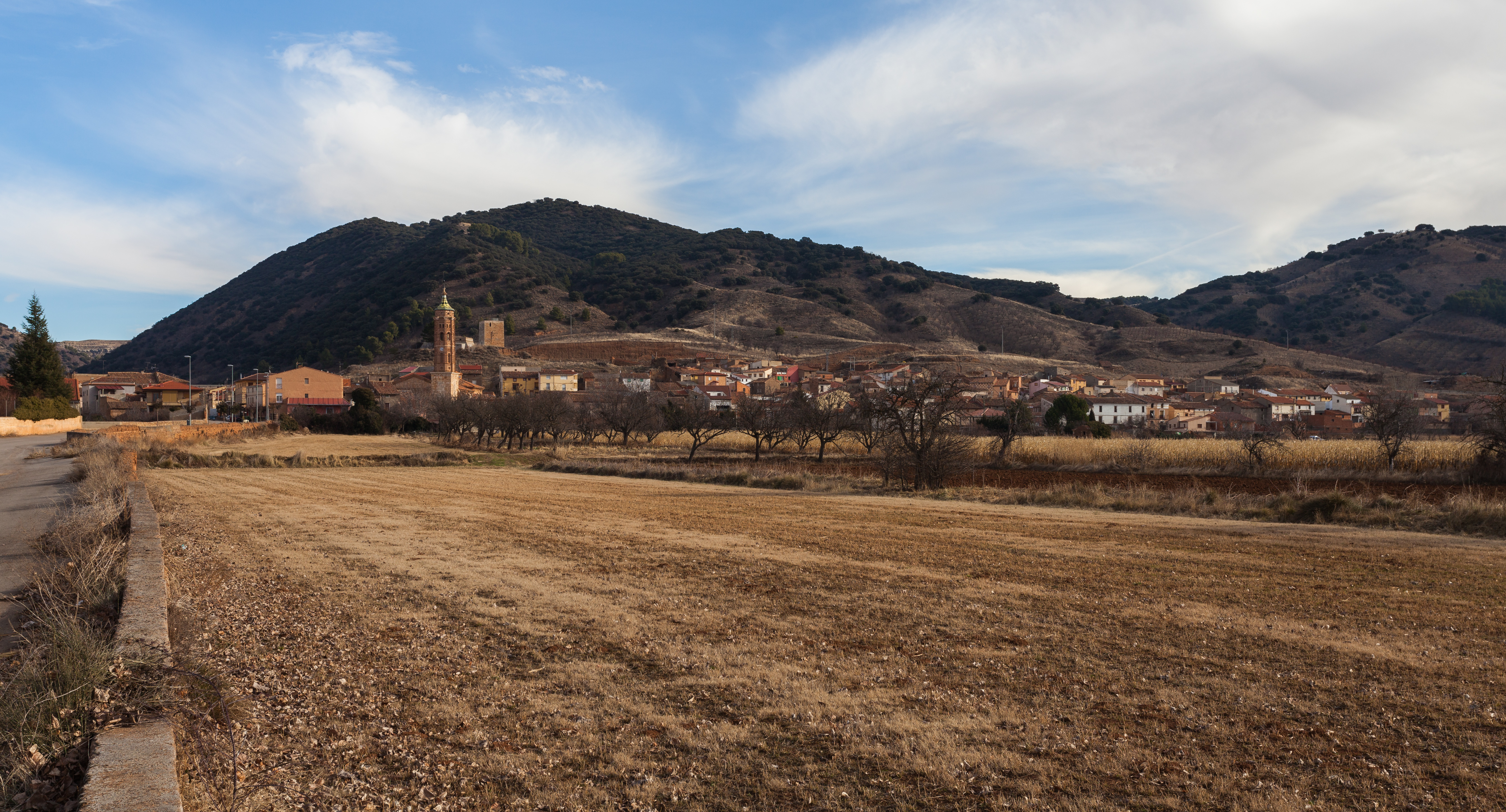

- Location within Spain
- Coordinates: 41°03′N 1°21′W
- Country: Spain
- Autonomous community: Aragon
- Province: Teruel
- Comarca: Jiloca Comarca

Area
  - Total: 25.17 km^{2} (9.72 sq mi)

Population (2025-01-01)
  - Total: 278
  - Density: 11.0/km^{2} (28.6/sq mi)
- Time zone: UTC+1 (CET)
  - Summer (DST): UTC+2 (CEST)

Báguena is a municipality in the province of Teruel, Aragon, Spain. According to the 2004 census (INE), the municipality had a population of 416 inhabitants.

== See also ==
- List of municipalities in Teruel
