= Castejón de Tornos =

Municipality in Aragon, Spain

Castejón de Tornos, Spain
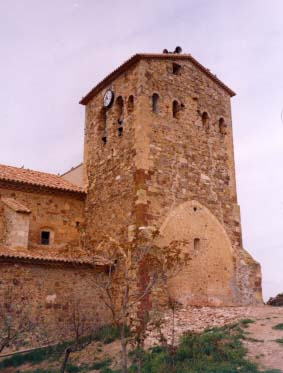

- Location within Spain
- Coordinates: 41°0′N 1°25′W
- Country: Spain
- Autonomous community: Aragon
- Province: Teruel
- Comarca: Jiloca

Area
  - Total: 30 km^{2} (12 sq mi)

Population (2025-01-01)
  - Total: 64
  - Density: 2.1/km^{2} (5.5/sq mi)
- Time zone: UTC+1 (CET)
  - Summer (DST): UTC+2 (CEST)

Castejón de Tornos is a municipality located in the province of Teruel, Aragon, Spain. According to the 2004 census (INE), the municipality has a population of 91 inhabitants.

== See also ==
- List of municipalities in Teruel
