= Odón =

- municipality
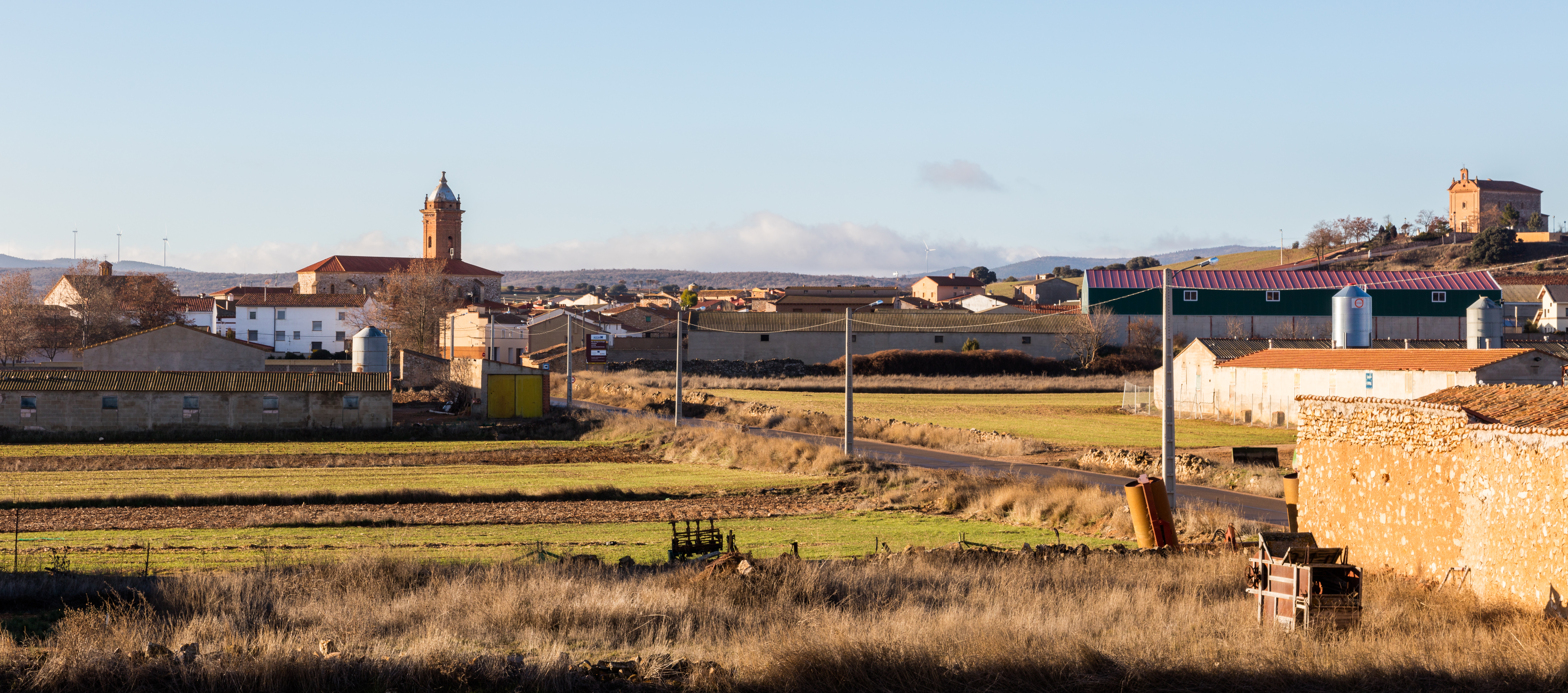

- Flag Coat of arms

- Location within Spain
- Coordinates: 40°53′N 1°34′W
- Country: Spain
- Autonomous community: Aragon
- Province: Teruel
- Comarca: Jiloca

Area
  - Total: 74 km^{2} (29 sq mi)

Population (2025-01-01)
  - Total: 191
  - Density: 2.6/km^{2} (6.7/sq mi)
- Time zone: UTC+1 (CET)
  - Summer (DST): UTC+2 (CEST)

Odón is a municipality located in the province of Teruel, Aragon, Spain. According to the 2004 census (INE), the municipality has a population of 259 inhabitants.

== See also ==
- List of municipalities in Teruel
