= Lagueruela =

- municipality
- Flag Coat of arms

- Location within Spain
- Coordinates: 41°3′N 1°11′W
- Country: Spain
- Autonomous community: Aragon
- Province: Teruel
- Comarca: Jiloca

Area
  - Total: 26 km^{2} (10 sq mi)
- Elevation: 1,066 m (3,497 ft)

Population (2025-01-01)
  - Total: 73
  - Density: 2.8/km^{2} (7.3/sq mi)
- Time zone: UTC+1 (CET)
  - Summer (DST): UTC+2 (CEST)

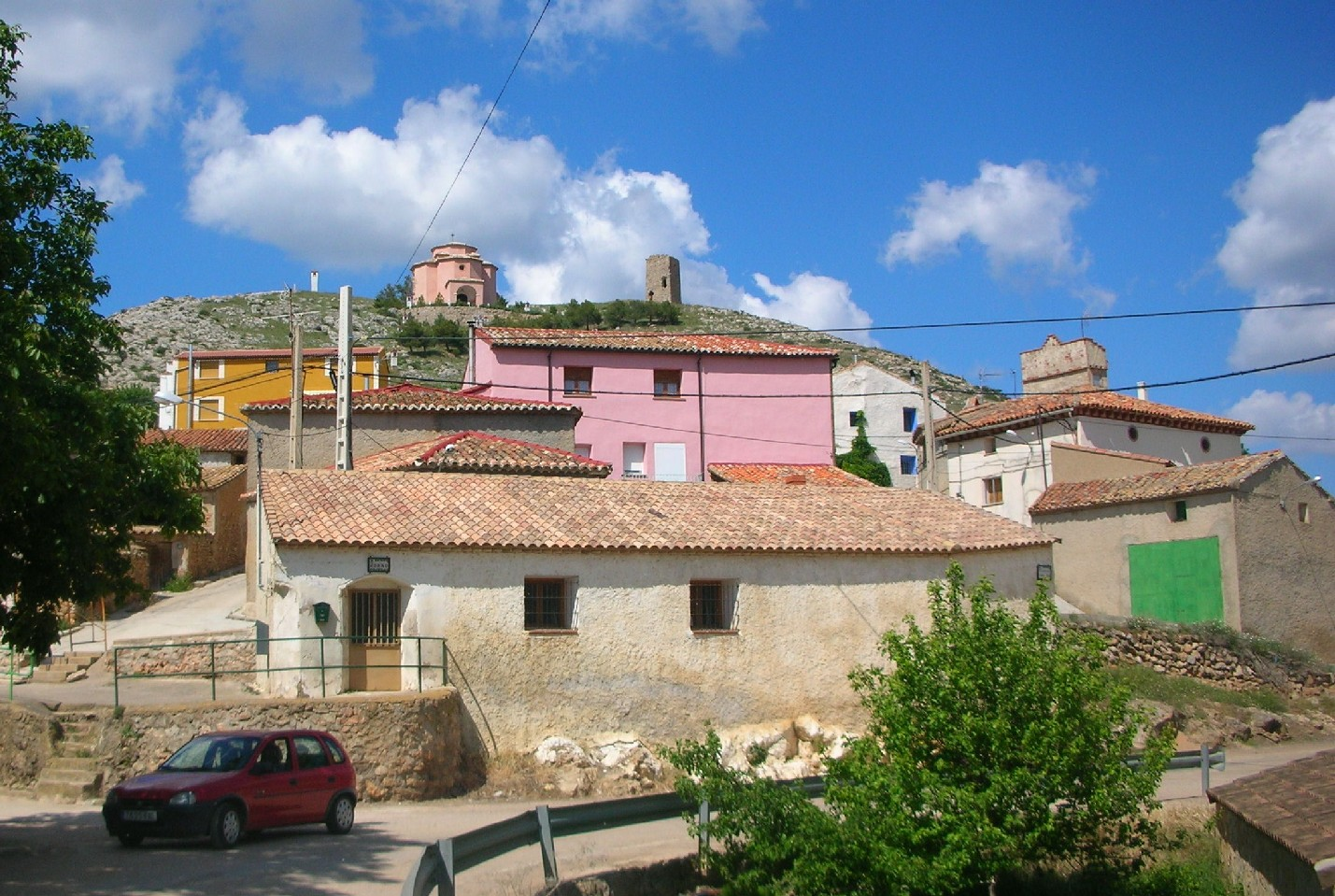
View of Lagueruela

Lagueruela is a municipality located in the province of Teruel, Aragon, Spain. According to the 2010 census the municipality has a population of 30 inhabitants.

Lagueruela is located in the Sierra de Cucalón area, in the high course of the Huerva River.

== See also ==
- Jiloca Comarca
- List of municipalities in Teruel
