= Fuentes Claras =

Fuentes Claras, Spain
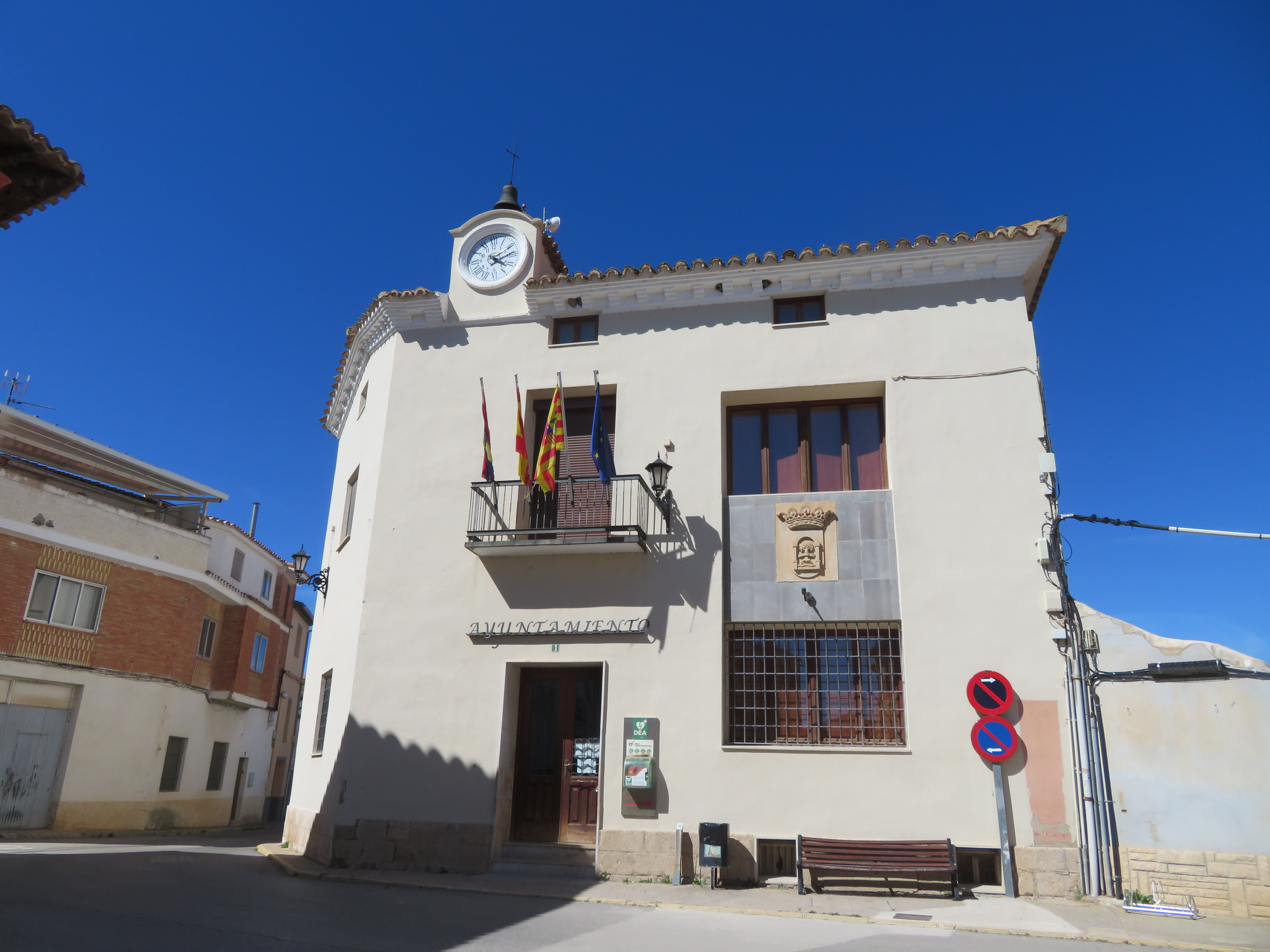
- Town hall

- Flag Coat of arms

- Location within Spain
- Coordinates: 40°52′N 1°19′W
- Country: Spain
- Autonomous community: Aragon
- Province: Teruel
- Comarca: Jiloca

Area
  - Total: 36 km^{2} (14 sq mi)
- Elevation: 909 m (2,982 ft)

Population (2025-01-01)
  - Total: 428
  - Density: 12/km^{2} (31/sq mi)
- Time zone: UTC+1 (CET)
  - Summer (DST): UTC+2 (CEST)

Fuentes Claras is a municipality located in the province of Teruel, Aragon, Spain. According to the 2004 census (INE), the municipality has a population of 571 inhabitants.

== See also ==
- List of municipalities in Teruel
