= Barrachina =

- municipality
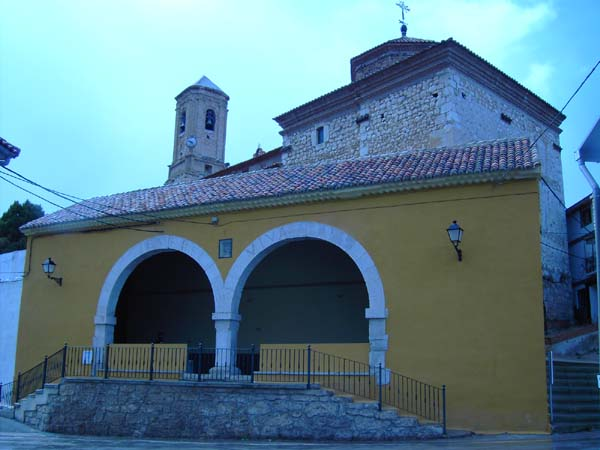

- Flag Coat of arms

- Location within Spain
- Coordinates: 40°54′N 1°8′W
- Country: Spain
- Autonomous community: Aragon
- Province: Teruel
- Comarca: Jiloca Comarca

Area
  - Total: 24.86 km^{2} (9.60 sq mi)
- Elevation: 1,047 m (3,435 ft)

Population (2025-01-01)
  - Total: 113
  - Density: 4.55/km^{2} (11.8/sq mi)
- Time zone: UTC+1 (CET)
  - Summer (DST): UTC+2 (CEST)

Barrachina is a municipality located in the province of Teruel, Aragon, Spain. According to the 2004 census (INE), the municipality had a population of 164 inhabitants.

== See also ==
- List of municipalities in Teruel
