= Pozuel del Campo =

- municipality
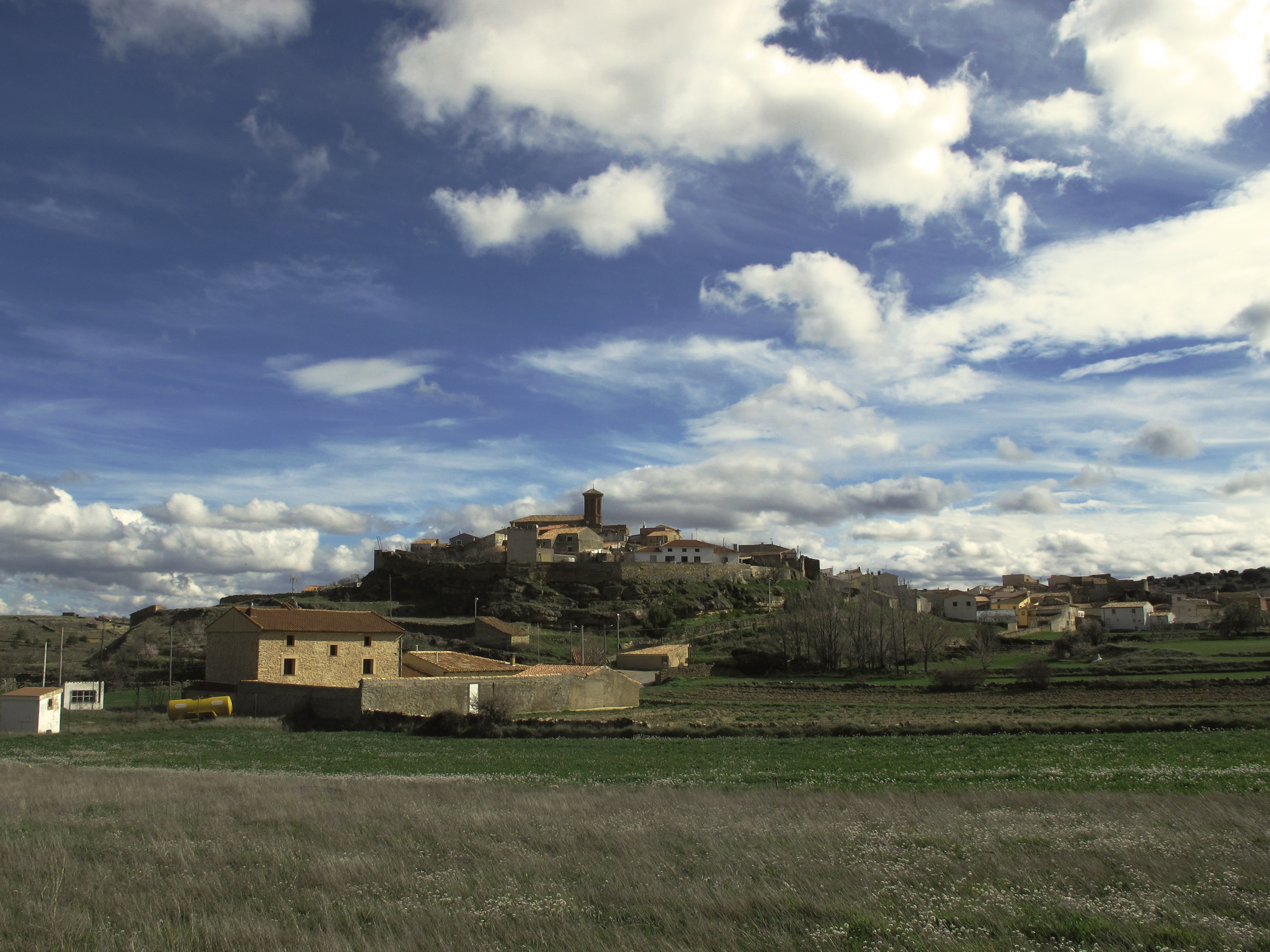

- Location within Spain
- Coordinates: 40°46′N 1°30′W
- Country: Spain
- Autonomous community: Aragon
- Province: Teruel
- Comarca: Jiloca

Area
  - Total: 27.85 km^{2} (10.75 sq mi)
- Elevation: 1,128 m (3,701 ft)

Population (2025-01-01)
  - Total: 76
  - Density: 2.7/km^{2} (7.1/sq mi)
- Time zone: UTC+1 (CET)
  - Summer (DST): UTC+2 (CEST)

Pozuel del Campo is a municipality located in the province of Teruel, Aragon, Spain. According to the 2004 census (INE), the municipality has a population of 110 inhabitants.

== See also ==
- List of municipalities in Teruel
