= Nogueras =

- municipality
- Coat of arms

- Location within Spain
- Coordinates: 41°08′N 1°04′W
- Country: Spain
- Autonomous community: Aragon
- Province: Teruel
- Comarca: Jiloca

Area
  - Total: 18 km^{2} (6.9 sq mi)

Population (2025-01-01)
  - Total: 36
  - Density: 2.0/km^{2} (5.2/sq mi)
- Time zone: UTC+1 (CET)
  - Summer (DST): UTC+2 (CEST)

Nogueras is a municipality located in the province of Teruel, Aragon, Spain. According to the 2004 census (INE), the municipality has a population of 18 inhabitants.

It is located in the Sierra de Cucalón area.

== See also ==
- Jiloca Comarca
- List of municipalities in Teruel
