= Ferreruela de Huerva =

- municipality
- Location within Spain
- Coordinates: 41°4′N 1°14′W
- Country: Spain
- Autonomous community: Aragon
- Province: Teruel
- Comarca: Jiloca

Area
  - Total: 20.47 km^{2} (7.90 sq mi)
- Elevation: 1,018 m (3,340 ft)

Population (2025-01-01)
  - Total: 81
  - Density: 4.0/km^{2} (10/sq mi)
- Time zone: UTC+1 (CET)
  - Summer (DST): UTC+2 (CEST)

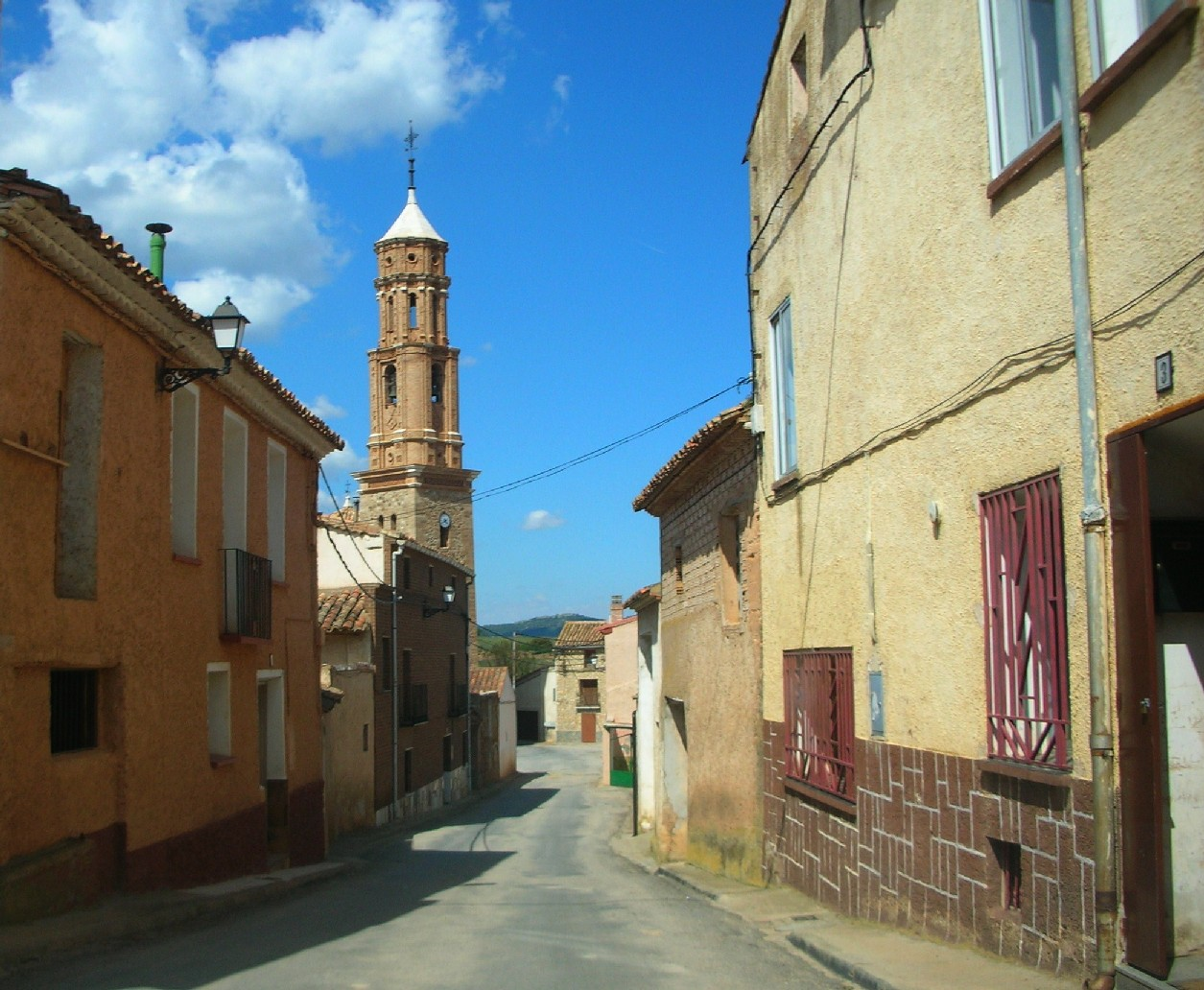
Street in Ferreruela

Ferreruela de Huerva, or simply Ferreruela, is a municipality located in the Jiloca Comarca, province of Teruel, Aragon, Spain. According to the 2010 census, the municipality has a population of 74 inhabitants.

Ferreruela is located in the Sierra de Cucalón area and it is named after the Huerva River.

== See also ==
- Jiloca Comarca
- List of municipalities in Teruel
