= Jiloca (comarca) =

Coordinates: 40°51′N 1°18′W

Jiloca Comarca Comarca del Jiloca
- Comarca
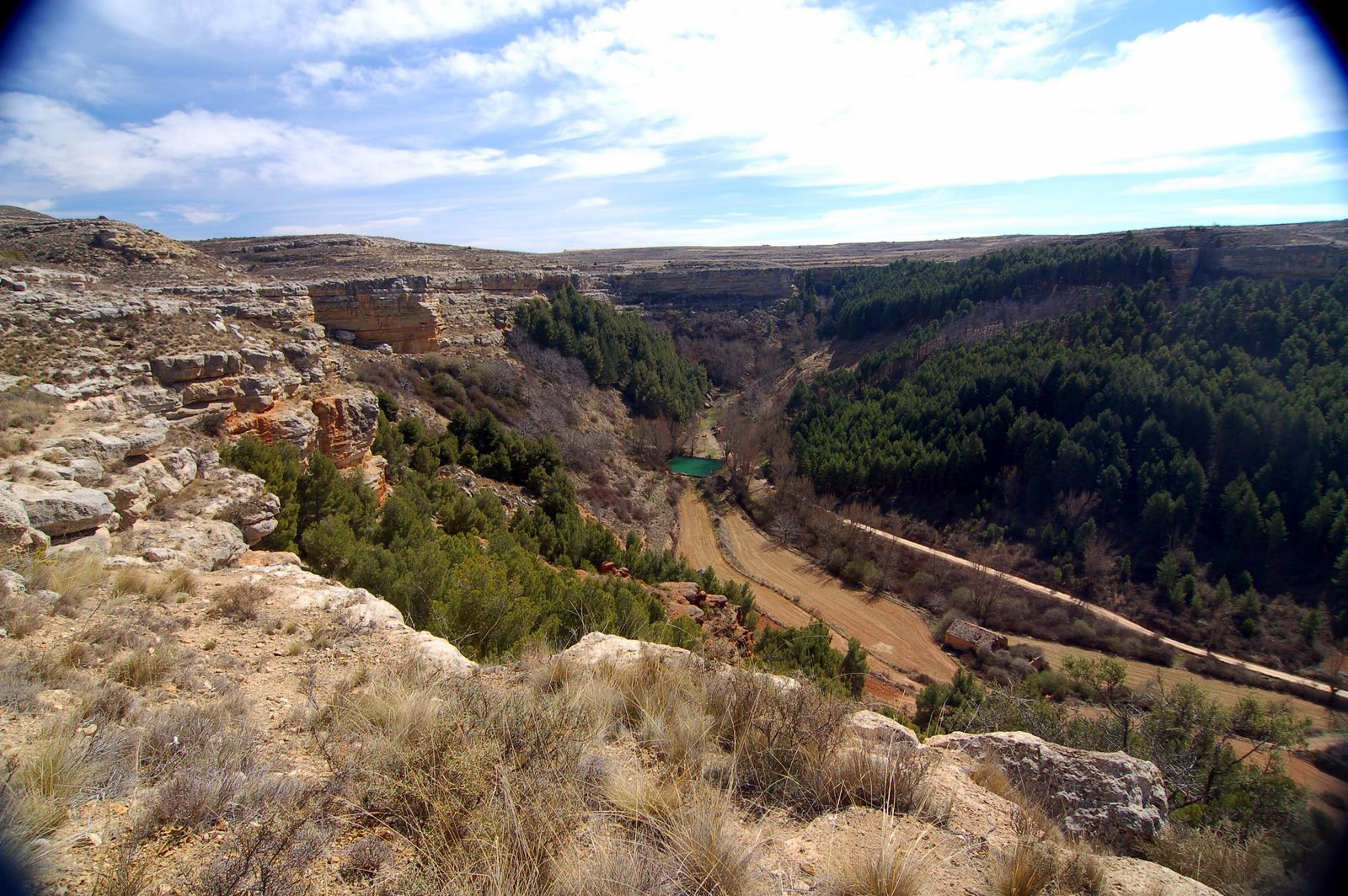
- View of Arguilay in Báguena

- Country: Spain
- Autonomous community: Aragon
- Province: Teruel
- Capital: Calamocha
- Municipalities: List: See text

Area
  - Total: 1,932.1 km^{2} (746.0 sq mi)

Population
  - Total: 13,829
  - Density: 7.1575/km^{2} (18.538/sq mi)
- Time zone: UTC+1 (CET)
  - Summer (DST): UTC+2 (CEST)
- Largest municipality: Calamocha

Jiloca Comarca is a comarca in Aragon, Spain. It is located in Teruel Province, in the mountainous Iberian System area.

Its capital is Calamocha and it was formerly known as Comarca de Calamocha.

The Jiloca River gives its name to this wine-producing comarca. The main mountain ranges in the area are Sierra Palomera, Sierra de Cucalón, Sierra Menera and Sierra de Santa Cruz-Valdelacasa.

== Municipalities ==
Allueva, Bádenas, Báguena, Bañón, Barrachina, Bea, Bello, Blancas, Bueña, Burbáguena, Calamocha, Caminreal, Castejón de Tornos, Cosa, Cucalón, Ferreruela de Huerva, Fonfría, Fuentes Claras, Lagueruela, Lanzuela, Loscos, Monforte de Moyuela, Monreal del Campo, Nogueras, Odón, Ojos Negros, Peracense, Pozuel del Campo, Rubielos de la Cérida, San Martín del Río, Santa Cruz de Nogueras, Singra, Tornos, Torralba de los Sisones, Torrecilla del Rebollar, Torre los Negros, Torrijo del Campo, Villafranca del Campo, Villahermosa del Campo, Villar del Salz

== See also ==
- Ribera del Jiloca
