= Bádenas =

Bádenas, Spain
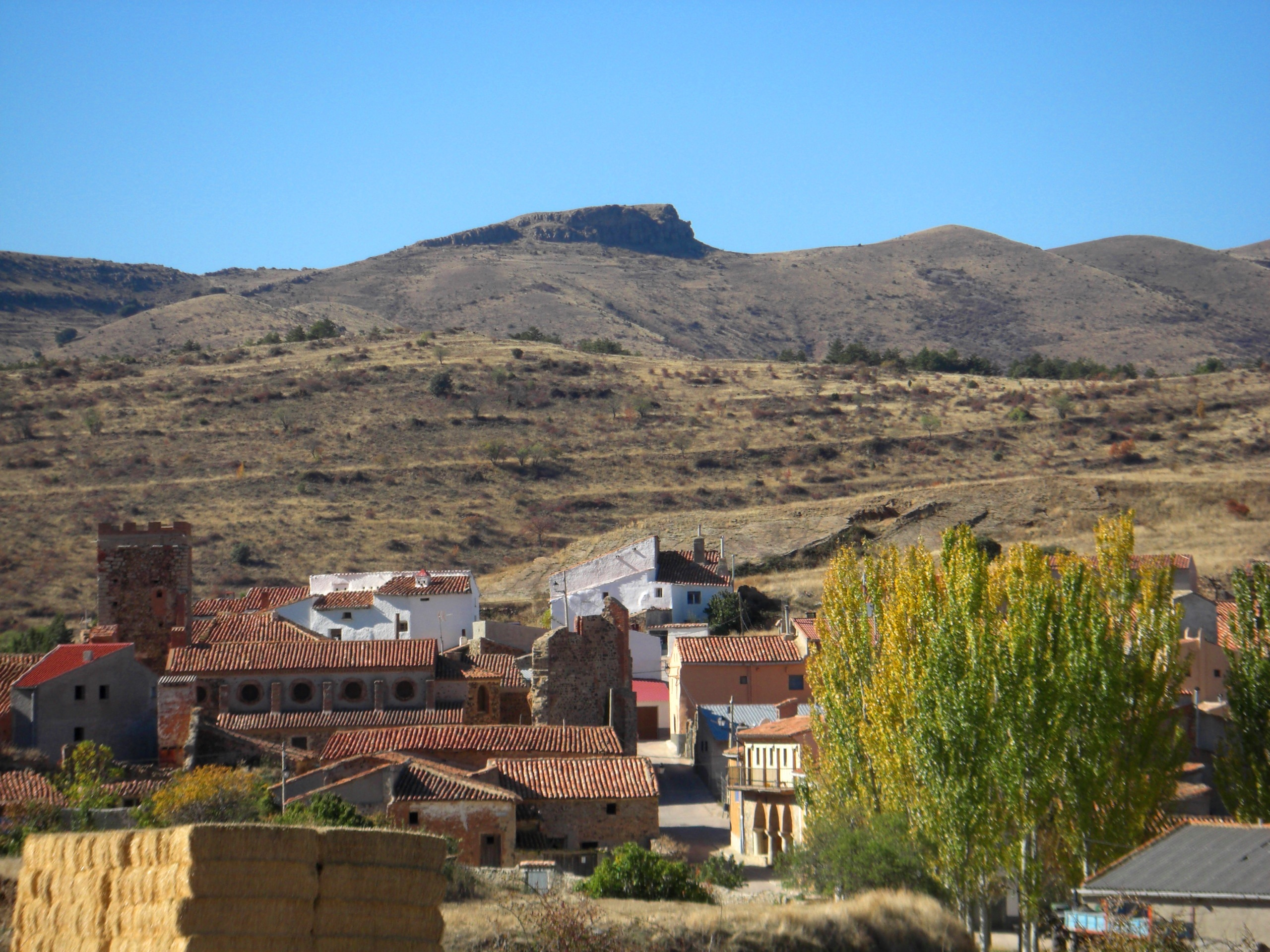

- Location within Spain
- Coordinates: 41°05′N 1°07′W
- Country: Spain
- Autonomous community: Aragon
- Province: Teruel
- Comarca: Jiloca Comarca

Area
  - Total: 31 km^{2} (12 sq mi)

Population (2025-01-01)
  - Total: 28
  - Density: 0.90/km^{2} (2.3/sq mi)
- Time zone: UTC+1 (CET)
  - Summer (DST): UTC+2 (CEST)

Bádenas is a municipality located in the province of Teruel, Aragon, Spain. According to the 2004 census (INE), the municipality has a population of 19 inhabitants.

== See also ==
- Sierra de Oriche, long system of mountain ranges lies approximately 30 kilometres (19 mi).
- List of municipalities in Teruel

== Gallery ==
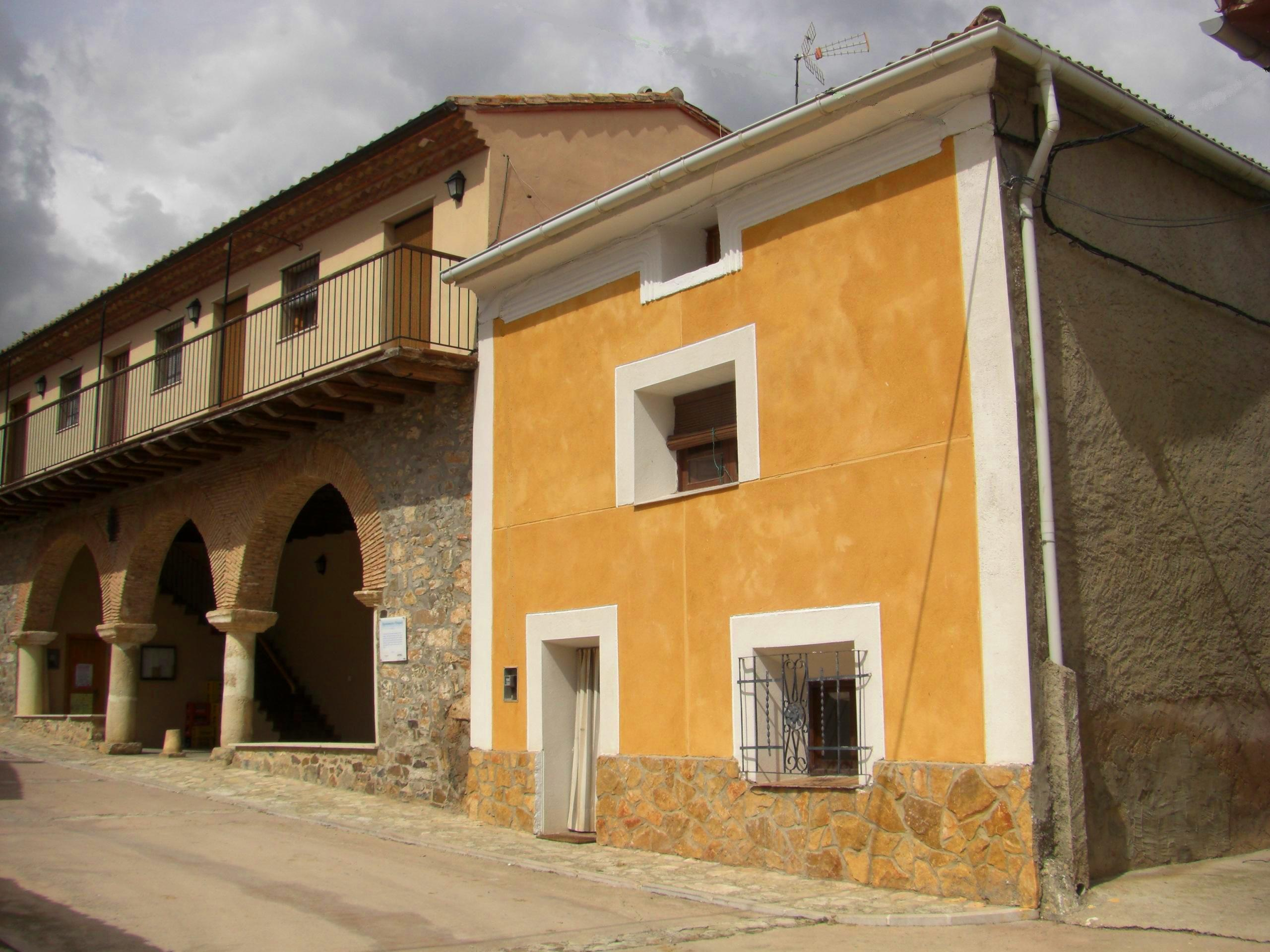
Ayuntamiento de Bádenas

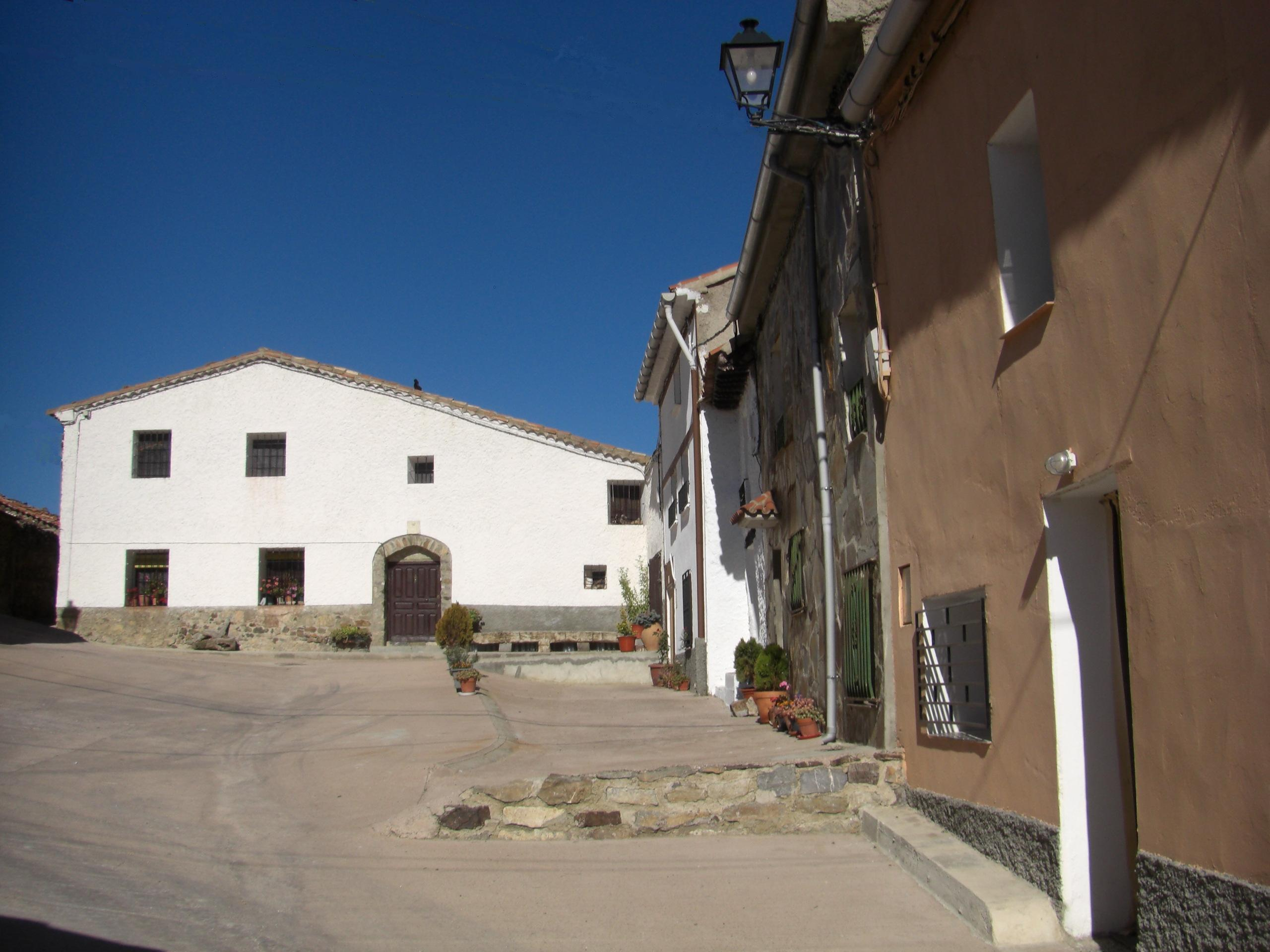
Barrio Alto

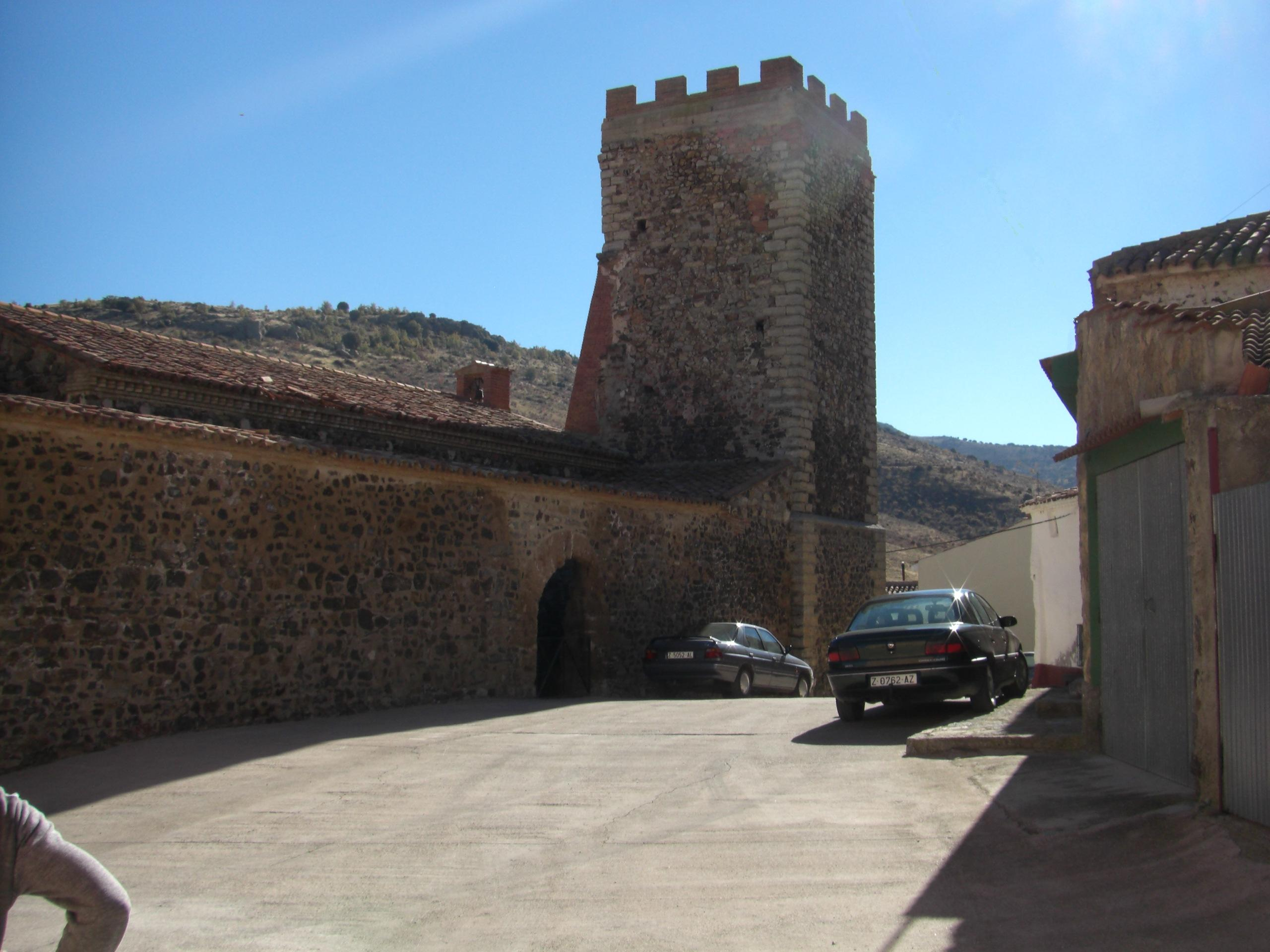
Restos de la torre de la Iglesia

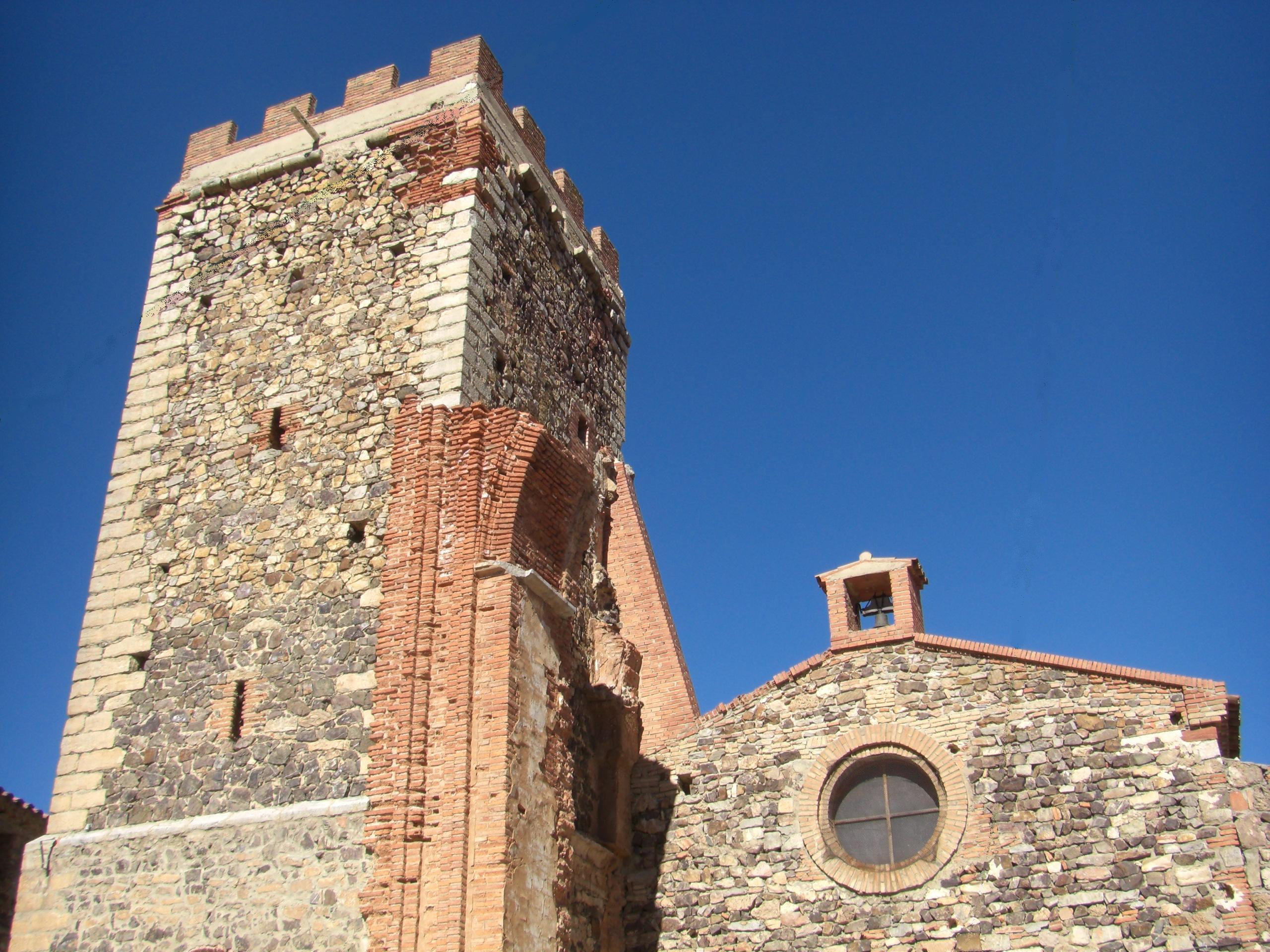
Frontal de la Iglesia

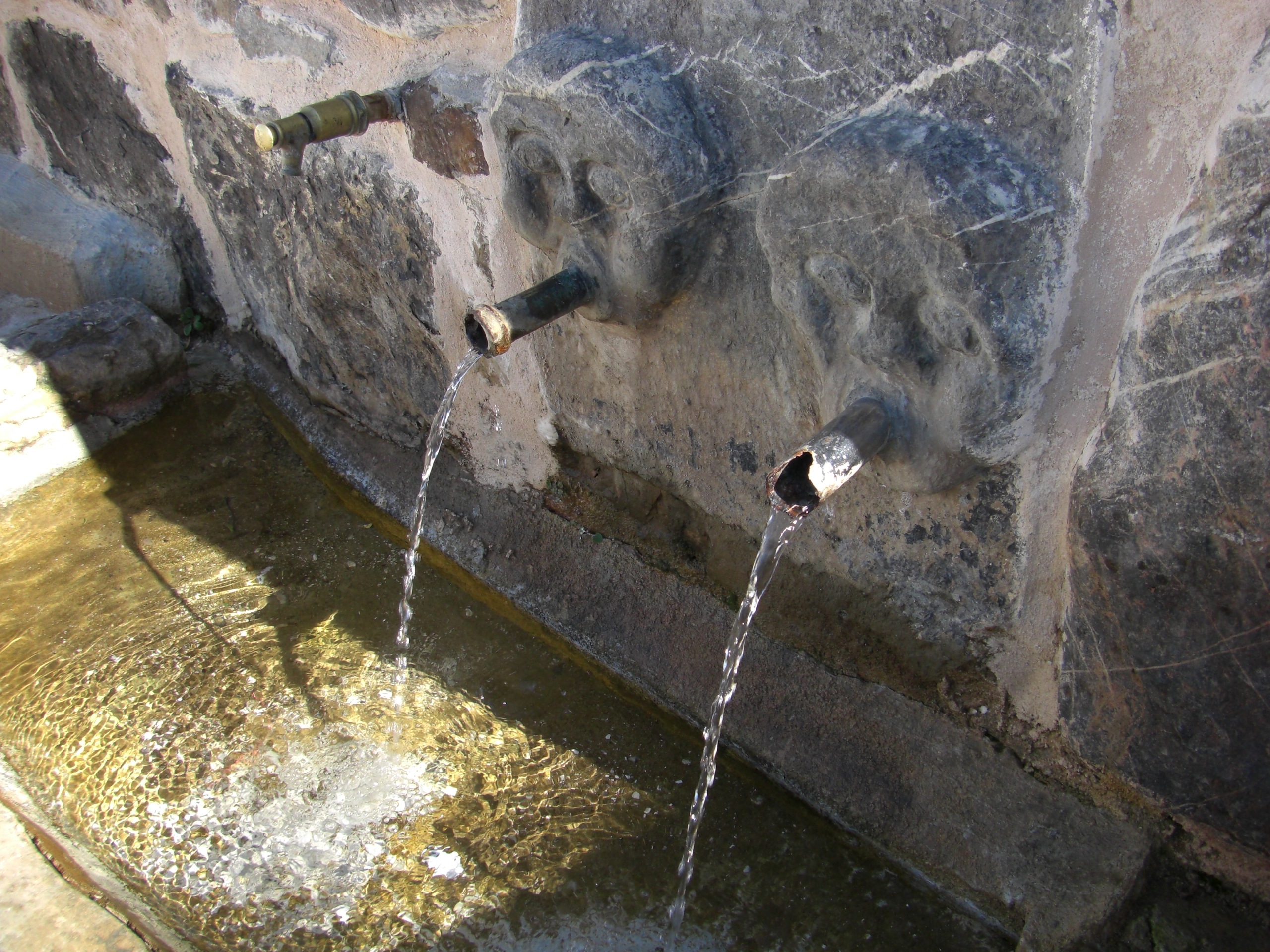
Fuente de Bádenas

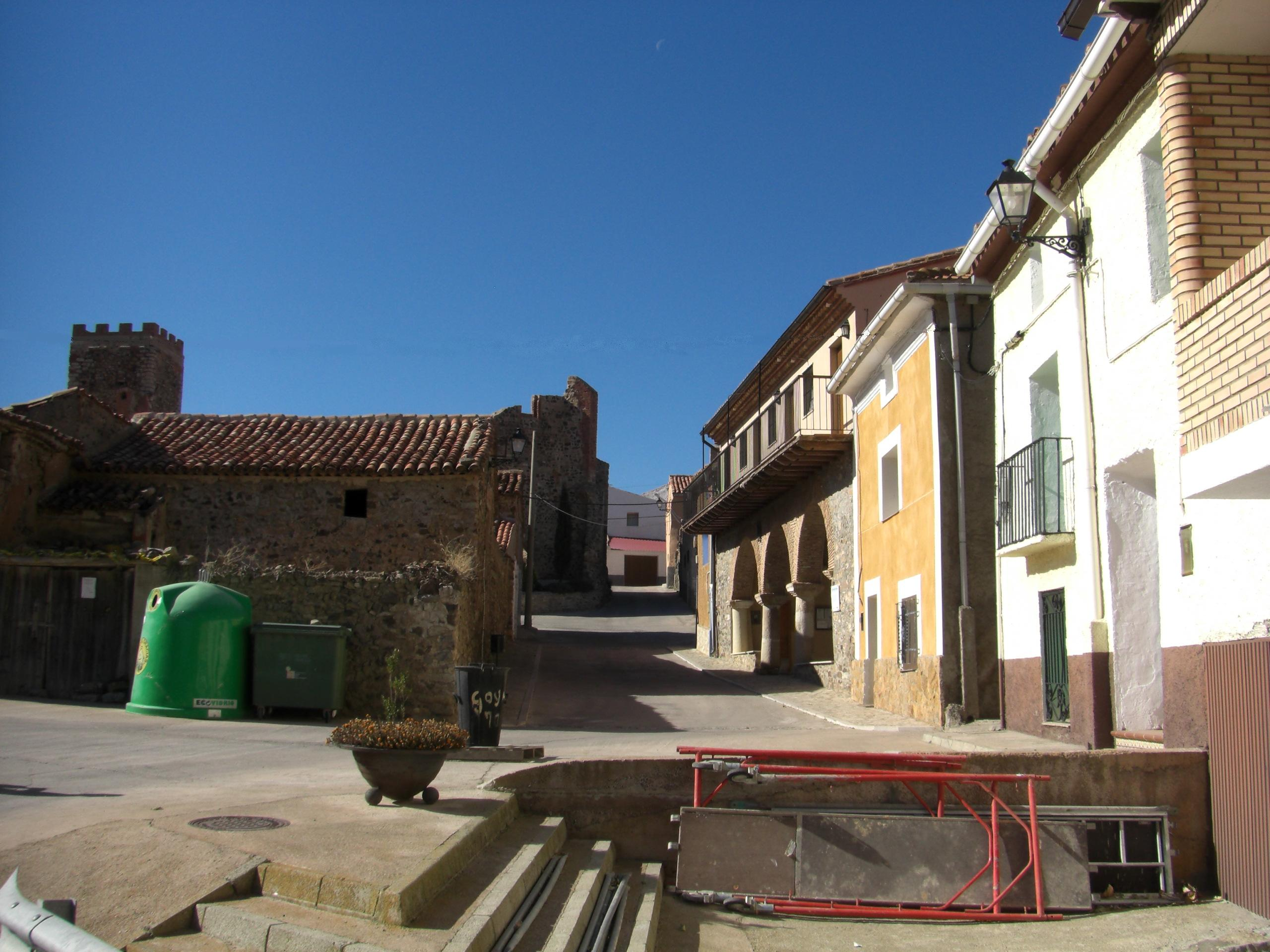
Calle del Ayuntamiento

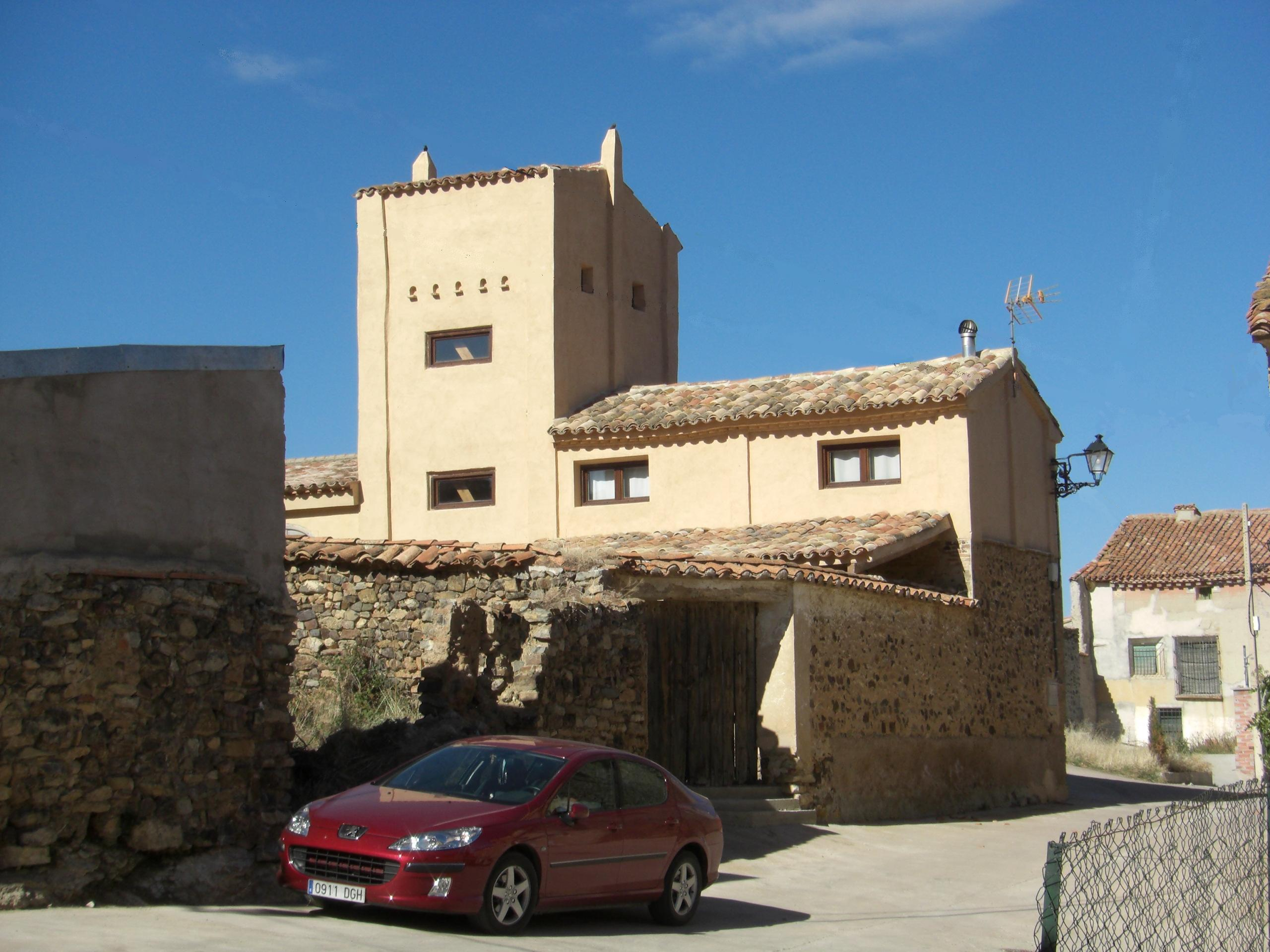
Antiguo palomar en Bádenas

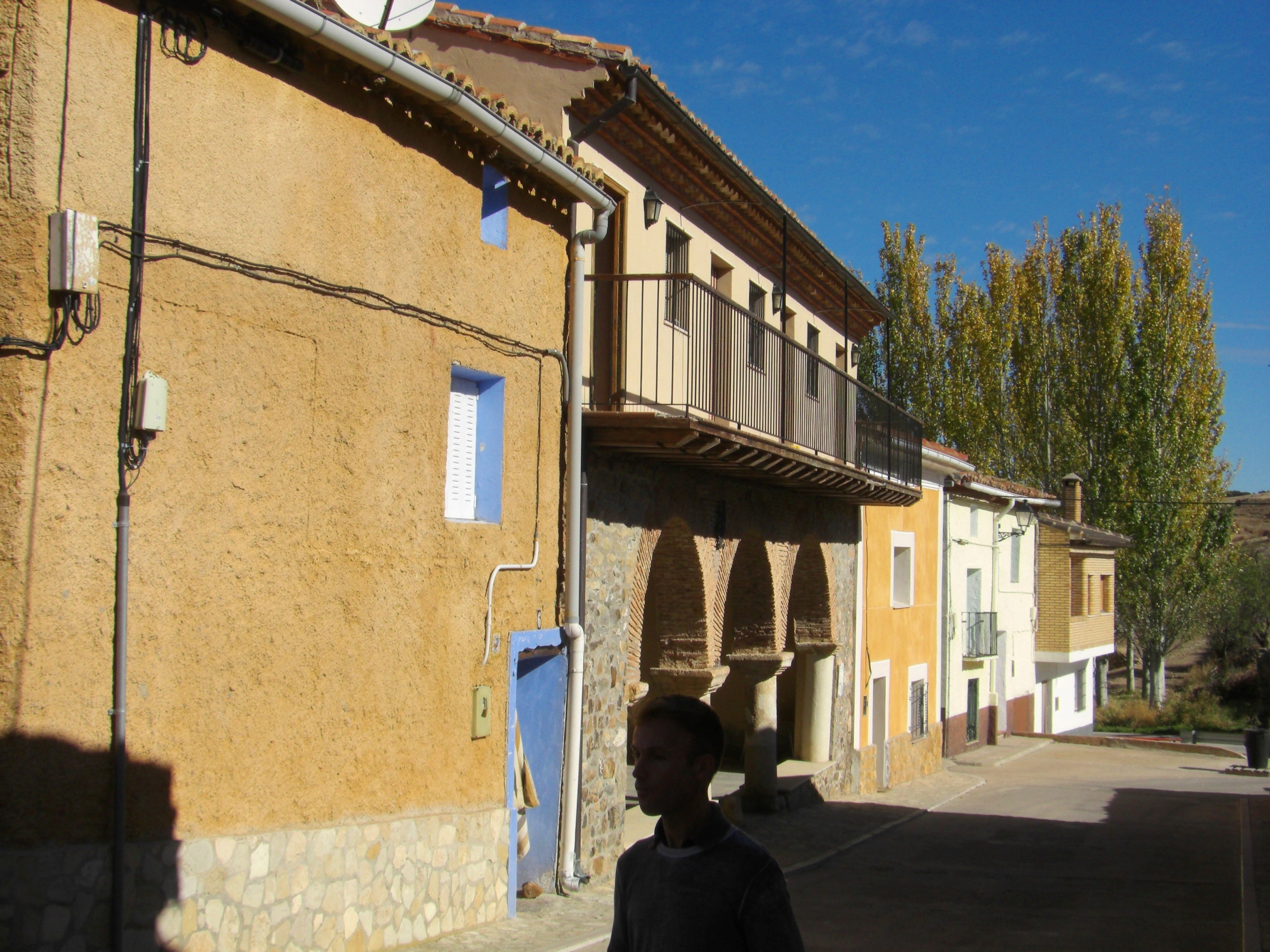
Otra vista del Ayuntamiento

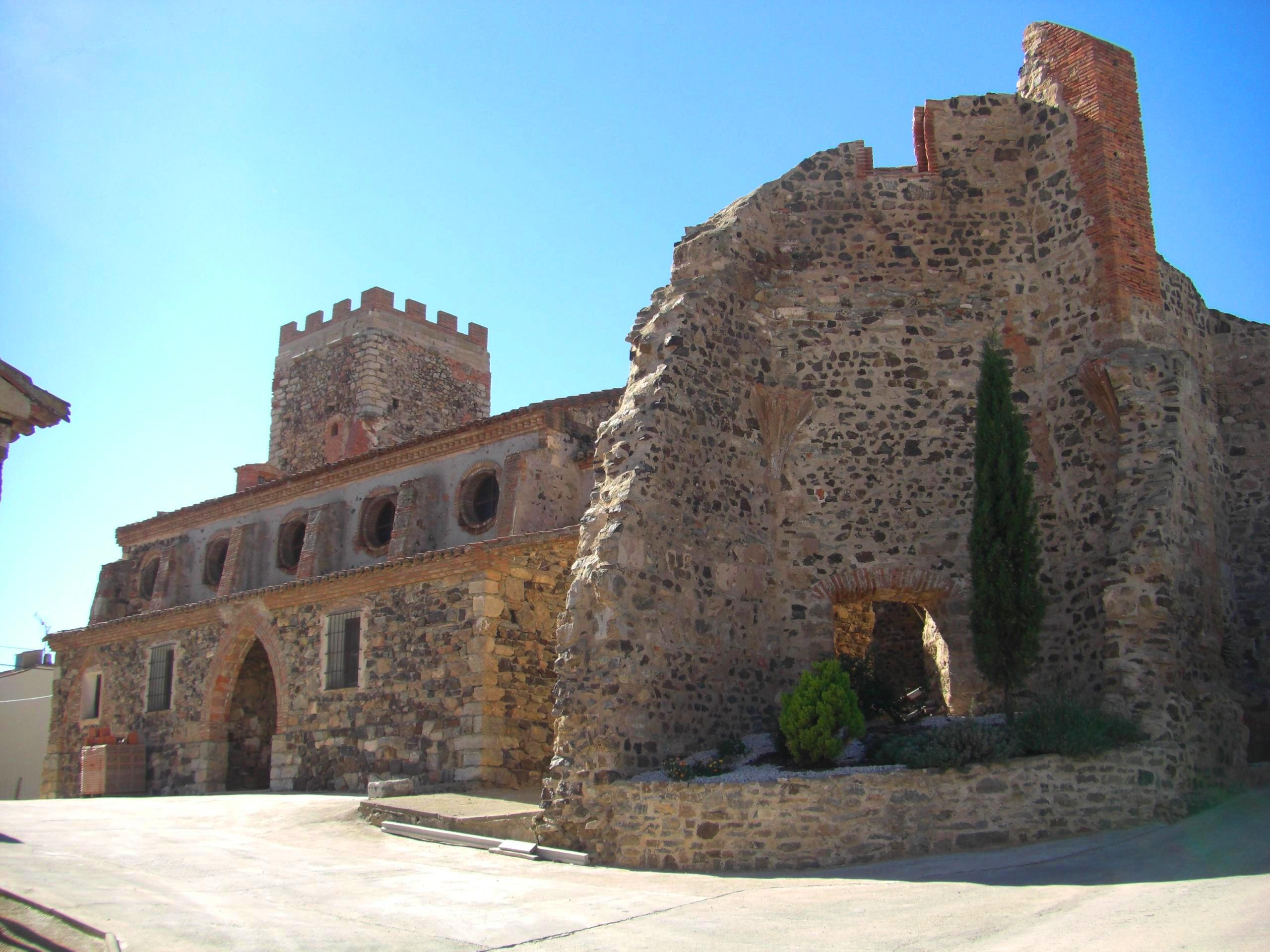
Restos de la Antigua iglesia

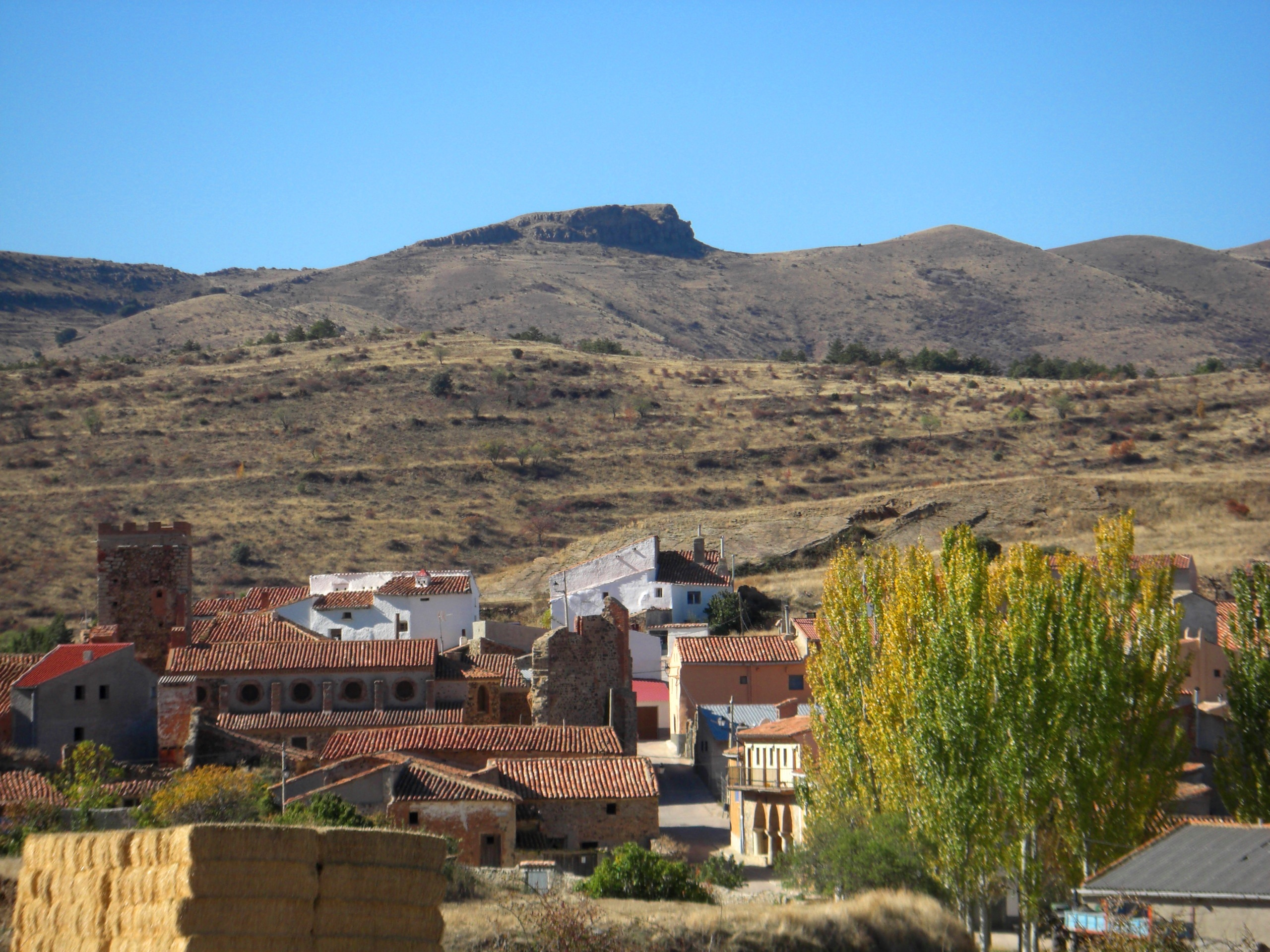
Bádenas

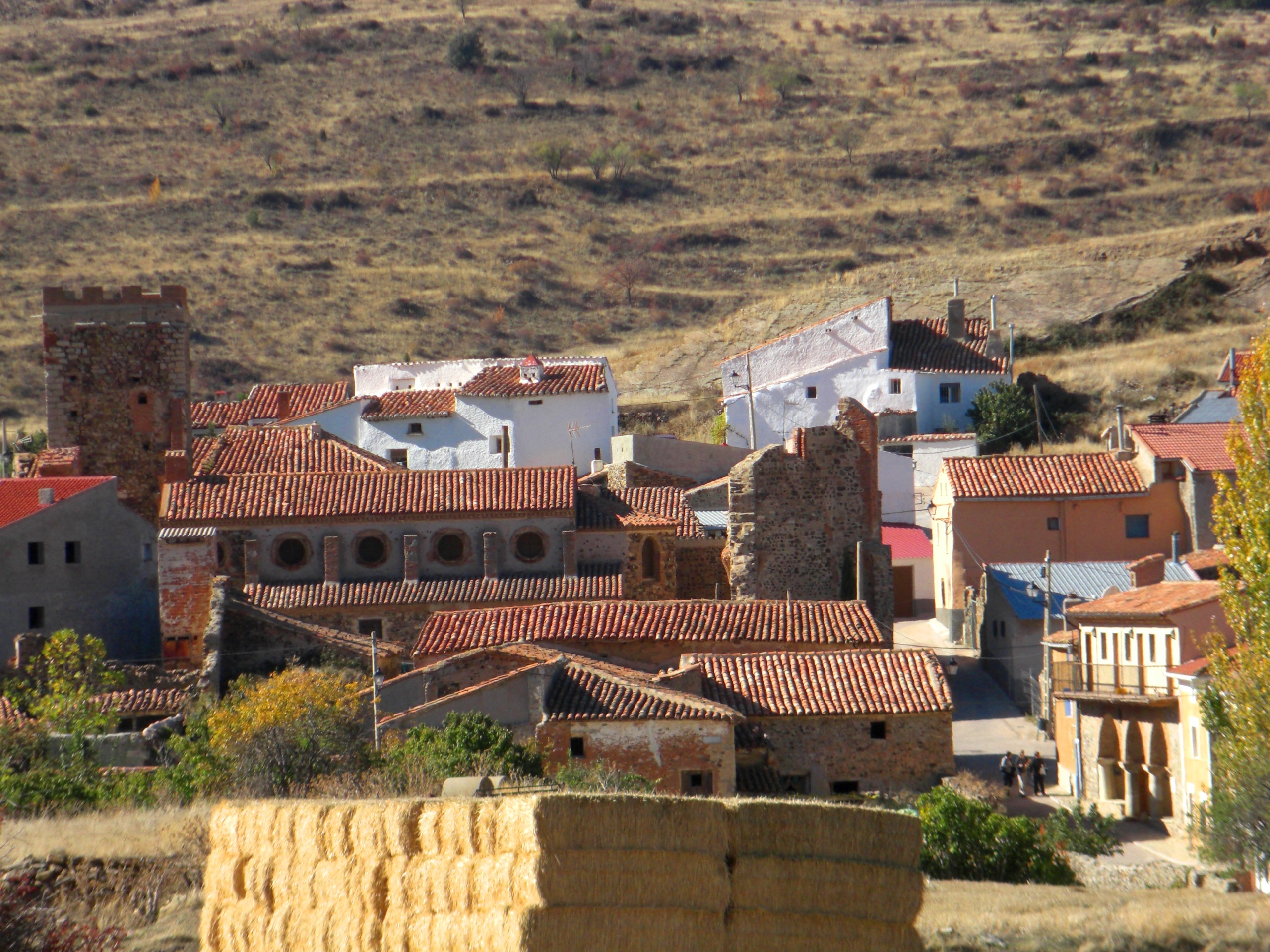
Bádenas

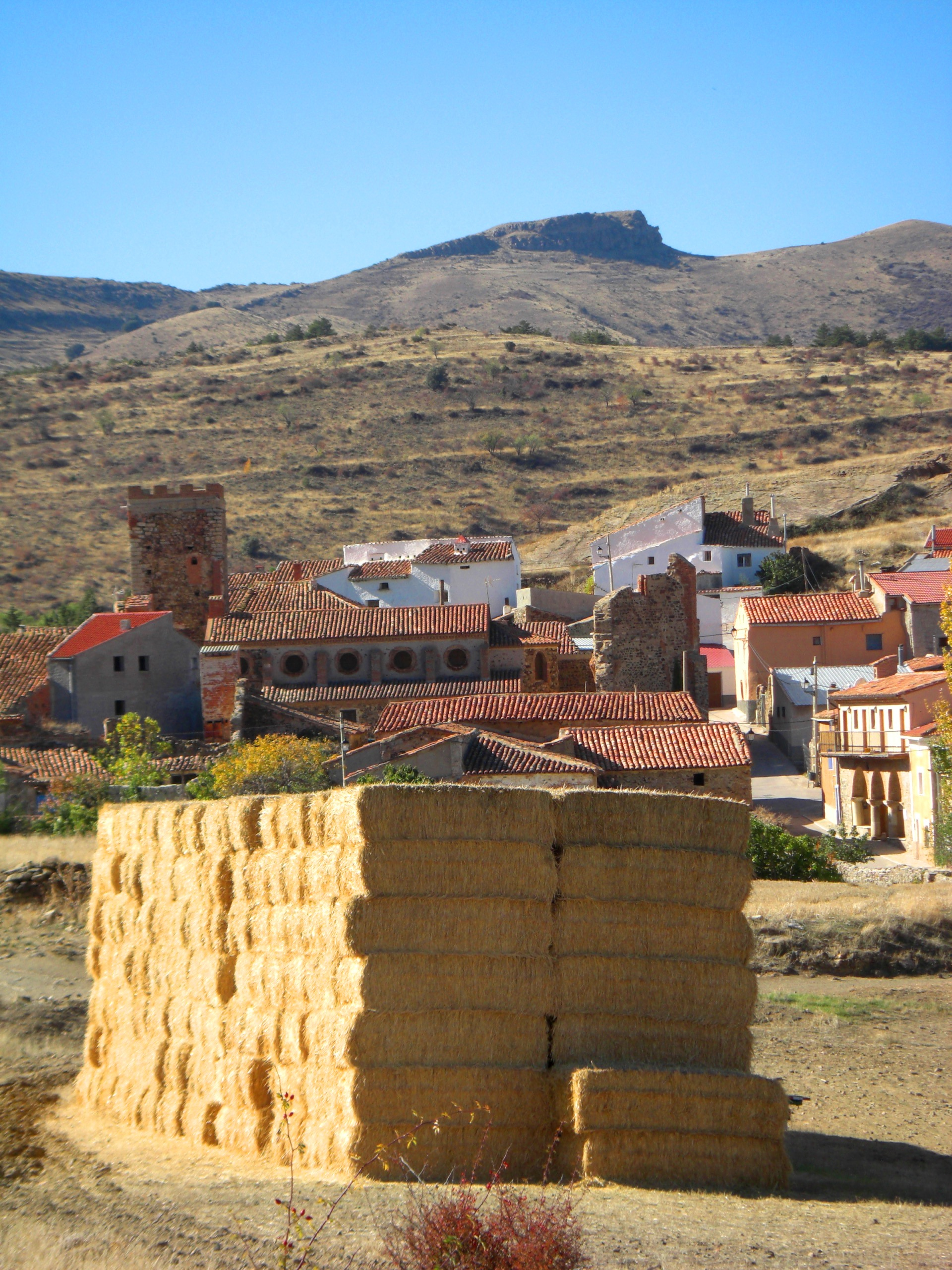
Bádenas
