= Bueña =

Bueña, Spain
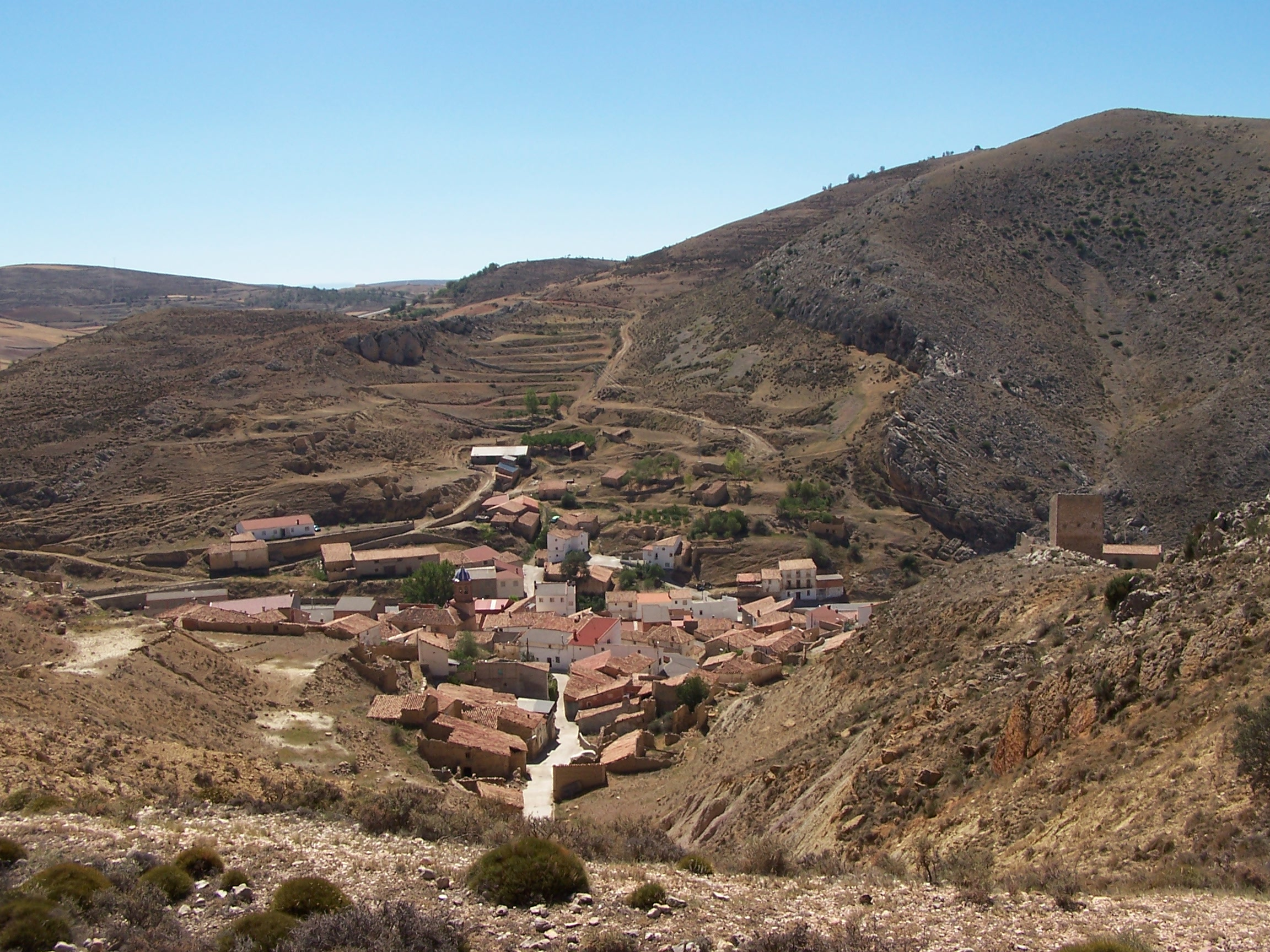

- Flag Coat of arms

- Location within Spain
- Coordinates: 40°42′N 1°16′W
- Country: Spain
- Autonomous community: Aragon
- Province: Teruel
- Comarca: Jiloca Comarca

Area
  - Total: 40 km^{2} (15 sq mi)
- Elevation: 1,213 m (3,980 ft)

Population (2025-01-01)
  - Total: 65
  - Density: 1.6/km^{2} (4.2/sq mi)
- Time zone: UTC+1 (CET)
  - Summer (DST): UTC+2 (CEST)

Bueña is a municipality located in the province of Teruel, Aragon, Spain. According to the 2004 census (INE), the municipality has a population of 79 inhabitants.

== See also ==
- List of municipalities in Teruel
