= Villar del Salz =

- municipality
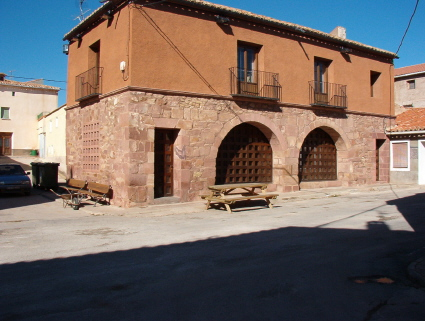

- Location within Spain
- Coordinates: 40°41′N 1°30′W
- Country: Spain
- Autonomous community: Aragon
- Province: Teruel
- Comarca: Jiloca

Area
  - Total: 38.69 km^{2} (14.94 sq mi)
- Elevation: 1,219 m (3,999 ft)

Population (2025-01-01)
  - Total: 58
  - Density: 1.5/km^{2} (3.9/sq mi)
- Time zone: UTC+1 (CET)
  - Summer (DST): UTC+2 (CEST)

Villar del Salz is a municipality located in the province of Teruel, Aragon, Spain. According to the 2004 census (INE), the municipality had a population of 104 inhabitants.

== See also ==
- List of municipalities in Teruel
