= Monreal del Campo =

- municipality
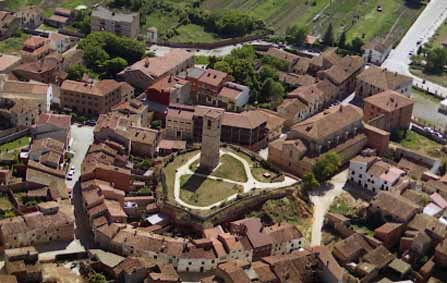

- Coat of arms

- Location within Spain
- Coordinates: 40°47′N 1°21′W
- Country: Spain
- Autonomous community: Aragon
- Province: Teruel
- Comarca: Jiloca

Area
  - Total: 89.05 km^{2} (34.38 sq mi)
- Elevation: 939 m (3,081 ft)

Population (2025-01-01)
  - Total: 2,578
  - Density: 28.95/km^{2} (74.98/sq mi)
- Time zone: UTC+1 (CET)
  - Summer (DST): UTC+2 (CEST)

Monreal del Campo is a municipality in the province of Teruel, Aragon, Spain. According to the 2004 census (INE), the municipality had a population of 2,391 inhabitants.

== See also ==
- List of municipalities in Teruel
