= Loscos =

- municipality
- Flag Coat of arms

- Location within Spain
- Coordinates: 41°5′N 1°2′W
- Country: Spain
- Autonomous community: Aragon
- Province: Teruel
- Comarca: Jiloca

Area
  - Total: 71.88 km^{2} (27.75 sq mi)
- Elevation: 981 m (3,219 ft)

Population (2025-01-01)
  - Total: 121
  - Density: 1.68/km^{2} (4.36/sq mi)
- Time zone: UTC+1 (CET)
  - Summer (DST): UTC+2 (CEST)

Loscos is a municipality located in the province of Teruel, Aragon, Spain. According to the 2004 census (INE), the municipality has a population of 184 inhabitants.

It is located in the Sierra de Cucalón area.

== See also ==
- Jiloca Comarca
- List of municipalities in Teruel
