= Calamocha =

- municipality
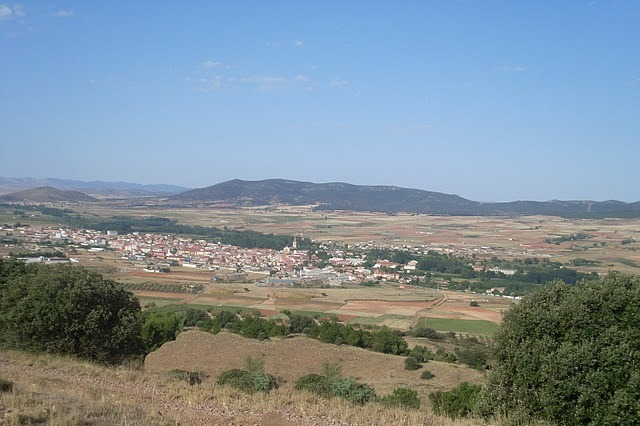

- Flag Coat of arms

- Location within Spain
- Coordinates: 40°55′2″N 1°18′0″W
- Country: Spain
- Autonomous community: Aragon
- Province: Teruel
- Comarca: Jiloca Comarca

Government
  - Mayor: Manuel Rando López (PSOE de Aragón) (2015–2019)

Area
  - Total: 316.63 km^{2} (122.25 sq mi)

Population (2025-01-01)
  - Total: 4,655
  - Density: 14.70/km^{2} (38.08/sq mi)
- Demonym: Calamochino
- Time zone: UTC+1 (CET)
  - Summer (DST): UTC+2 (CEST)

Calamocha is a town and municipality of Teruel province in the autonomous community of Aragon, Spain. In 2015 the municipality had a population of 4,417 inhabitants.

Calamocha is the administrative centre of the Aragonese comarca of Jiloca. On January 12, 2021, a minimum temperature of −21.3 °C (−6.3 °F) was registered in a close village called Fuentes Claras.

== Villages ==
As well as the town of Calamocha itself, the following villages and hamlets form part of the municipality:

- Collados
- Cuencabuena
- Cutanda
- Lechago
- Luco de Jiloca
- Navarrete del Río
- Nueros
- Olalla
- El Poyo del Cid
- Valverde
- Villarejo de los Olmos

== Climate ==
Calamocha has a transitional climate between the oceanic climate (Köppen climate classification: Cfb), the humid subtropical climate (Cfa) and the cold semi-arid climate (BSk). Rainfall throughout the year is generally scarce, with a peak in precipitation in the spring months, while winter is the driest season. Winters are cold, with minimum temperatures often below −5 °C (23 °F). Summers are warm, but days can be hot, often above 30 °C (86 °F), although the nights remain relatively cool.

Climate data for Calamocha (1992–2020), extremes (1992-present)
| Month | Jan | Feb | Mar | Apr | May | Jun | Jul | Aug | Sep | Oct | Nov | Dec | Year |
|---|---|---|---|---|---|---|---|---|---|---|---|---|---|
| Record high °C (°F) | 21.3 (70.3) | 23.0 (73.4) | 28.0 (82.4) | 32.1 (89.8) | 35.8 (96.4) | 39.5 (103.1) | 39.0 (102.2) | 39.9 (103.8) | 37.3 (99.1) | 32.8 (91.0) | 25.2 (77.4) | 20.3 (68.5) | 39.9 (103.8) |
| Mean daily maximum °C (°F) | 9.7 (49.5) | 11.6 (52.9) | 15.1 (59.2) | 17.2 (63.0) | 21.6 (70.9) | 27.0 (80.6) | 30.7 (87.3) | 30.5 (86.9) | 24.9 (76.8) | 19.6 (67.3) | 13.2 (55.8) | 10.2 (50.4) | 19.3 (66.7) |
| Daily mean °C (°F) | 4.0 (39.2) | 5.1 (41.2) | 7.9 (46.2) | 10.1 (50.2) | 14.2 (57.6) | 18.8 (65.8) | 21.8 (71.2) | 21.9 (71.4) | 17.1 (62.8) | 12.8 (55.0) | 7.4 (45.3) | 4.5 (40.1) | 12.1 (53.8) |
| Mean daily minimum °C (°F) | −1.7 (28.9) | −1.4 (29.5) | 0.6 (33.1) | 2.9 (37.2) | 6.8 (44.2) | 10.6 (51.1) | 12.9 (55.2) | 13.3 (55.9) | 9.3 (48.7) | 6.0 (42.8) | 1.5 (34.7) | −1.2 (29.8) | 5.0 (40.9) |
| Record low °C (°F) | −21.3 (−6.3) | −13.0 (8.6) | −8.1 (17.4) | −8.0 (17.6) | −3.8 (25.2) | 0.9 (33.6) | 1.6 (34.9) | 2.0 (35.6) | −1.0 (30.2) | −4.3 (24.3) | −10.0 (14.0) | −20.0 (−4.0) | −21.3 (−6.3) |
| Average precipitation mm (inches) | 22 (0.9) | 18 (0.7) | 27 (1.1) | 46 (1.8) | 57 (2.2) | 45 (1.8) | 23 (0.9) | 28 (1.1) | 29 (1.1) | 38 (1.5) | 35 (1.4) | 22 (0.9) | 390 (15.4) |
| Average precipitation days (≥ 1 mm) | 5.0 | 4.5 | 5.4 | 7.4 | 8.1 | 5.9 | 3.2 | 3.8 | 4.4 | 5.9 | 6.1 | 4.8 | 64.5 |
| Average snowy days | 2.6 | 3.3 | 2.0 | 0.8 | 0 | 0 | 0 | 0 | 0 | 0.2 | 1.1 | 1.3 | 11.3 |
| Average relative humidity (%) | 75 | 68 | 62 | 61 | 58 | 52 | 47 | 51 | 61 | 69 | 75 | 77 | 63 |
| Mean monthly sunshine hours | 140 | 161 | 214 | 213 | 248 | 285 | 329 | 301 | 237 | 189 | 138 | 130 | 2,585 |
Source: Agencia Estatal de Meteorologia

== See also ==
- List of municipalities in Teruel
