= Bello, Aragon =

Bello, Spain
- Flag Coat of arms

- Location within Spain
- Coordinates: 40°55′N 1°30′W
- Country: Spain
- Autonomous community: Aragon
- Province: Teruel
- Comarca: Jiloca Comarca

Area
  - Total: 51 km^{2} (20 sq mi)

Population (2025-01-01)
  - Total: 204
- Time zone: UTC+1 (CET)
  - Summer (DST): UTC+2 (CEST)

Bello is a municipality located in the province of Teruel, Aragon, Spain. According to the 2003 census (INE), the municipality has a population of 369 inhabitants.

This town is located close to the Laguna de Gallocanta natural lake. On January 12, 2021, a minimum temperature of −25.4 °C (−13.7 °F) was registered.

== See also ==
- List of municipalities in Teruel
