= Vía Verde de Ojos Negros =

Greenway in Spain

Vía verde de Ojos Negros
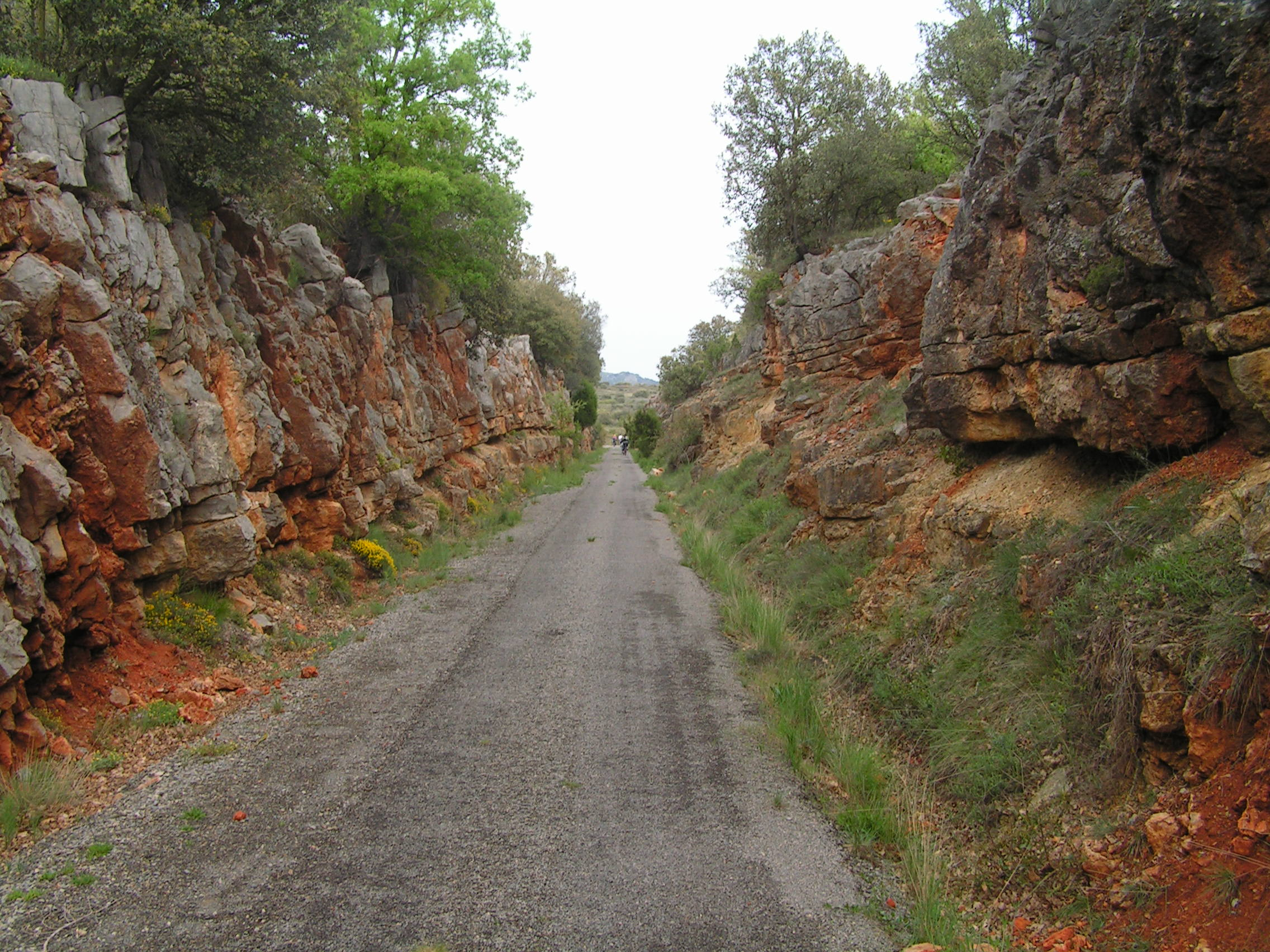
- Ojos Negros greenway
- Length: 159.7 km (99.2 mi)
- Location: Province of Valencia – Province of Castellón – Province of Teruel, Spain
- Trailheads: Algímia d'Alfara; Santa Eulalia del Campo
- Use: Hiking, cycling, horse riding
- Elevation change: 1,051 m (3,448 ft)
- Highest point: 1,218 m (3,996 ft)
- Lowest point: 183 m (600 ft)
- Difficulty: Moderate
- Season: Spring, summer, autumn
- Sights: Historic town centres of Segorbe, Jérica, Sarrión, La Puebla de Valverde, Teruel; Mudéjar Architecture of Aragon (UNESCO World Heritage); Sierra de Espadán, Sierra Calderona, Sierra de Toro, Sierra de Javalambre
- Surface: Asphalt, compact gravel, earth
- Website: www.viasverdes.com/en/

The Ojos Negros Greenway (la Vía Verde de Ojos Negros, in Spanish, also known as la Vía Minera), is a 160-kilometre greenway in Spain running between the village of Santa Eulalia del Campo in the province of Teruel in Aragón and the village of Algimia d'Alfara, in the province of Valencia in the Valencian Community.

Divided into two sections, it forms part of Spain's 2,700 kilometre "Via Verde" rail trail network, which is coordinated and promoted by the Spanish Railways Foundation (Fundación de los ferrocarriles españoles).

It is currently the longest greenway in Spain.

== History ==
Towards the end of the 19th century, the rights for the exploitation of iron deposits in the municipality of Ojos Negros in Teruel were granted to several Basque businessmen, who subsequently founded Compañía Minera de Sierra Menera on 3 September 1900. The combination of the quantity and the quality of the mineral extracted, as well as discrepancies with the management of Ferrocarril central de Aragón (which operated the main Teruel - Sagunto line, which runs parallel to the rail trail in many stretches), led the company to apply for a licence to construct a narrow-gauge railway for the transportation of the iron ore to Puerto de Sagunto, on the Mediterranean Coast.

The 200-km long railway line was built in 1903, and at the time of its construction it was the longest private company-owned railway line in Europe.

A need for greater transportation capacity finally led to the closure of line on 29 July 1972 and, following the closure of the ore-processing facilities in Sagunto, the Sierra Menera mining company went bankrupt in 1987.

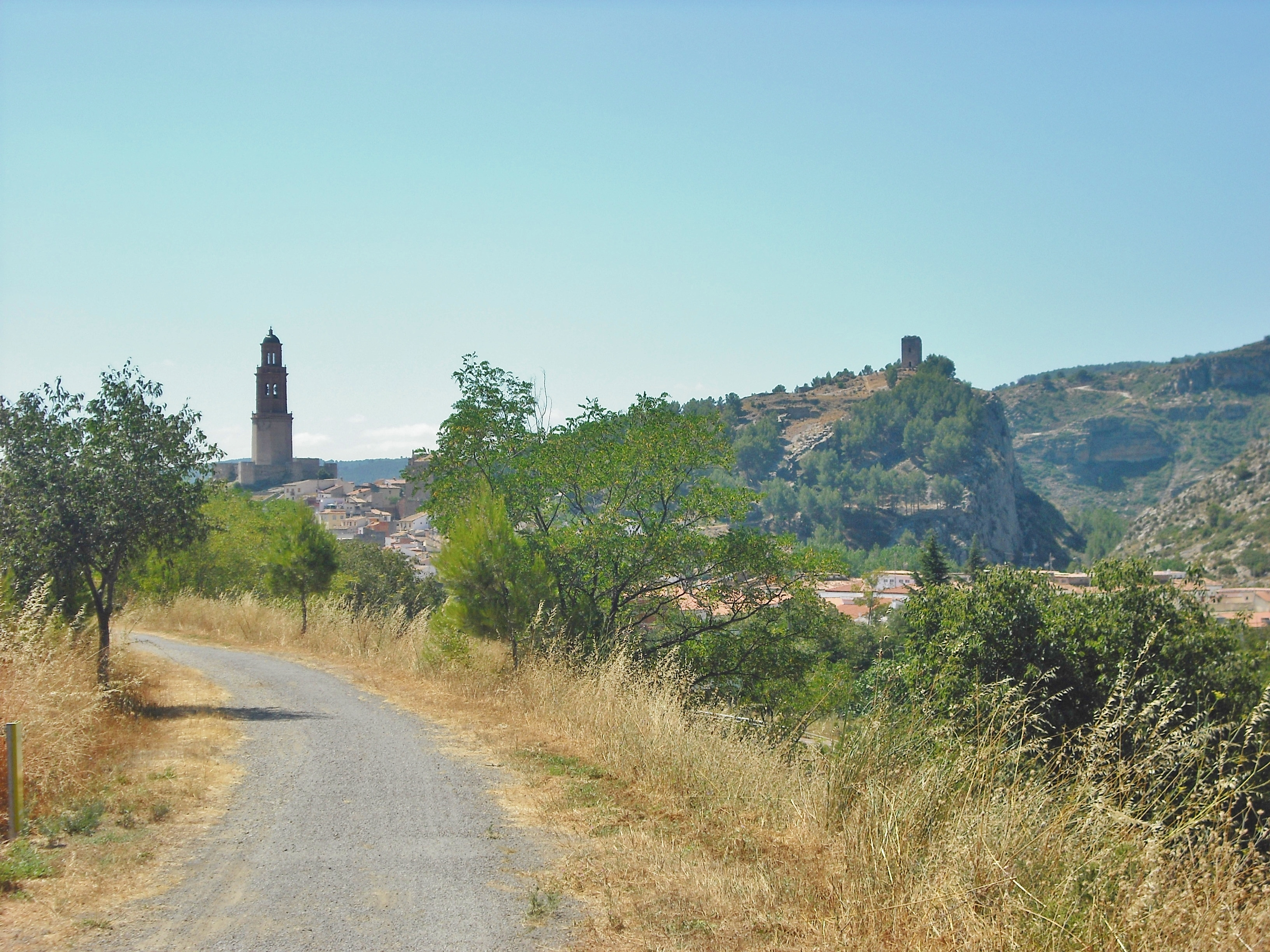
The town of Jérica seen from the Ojos Verdes greenway.

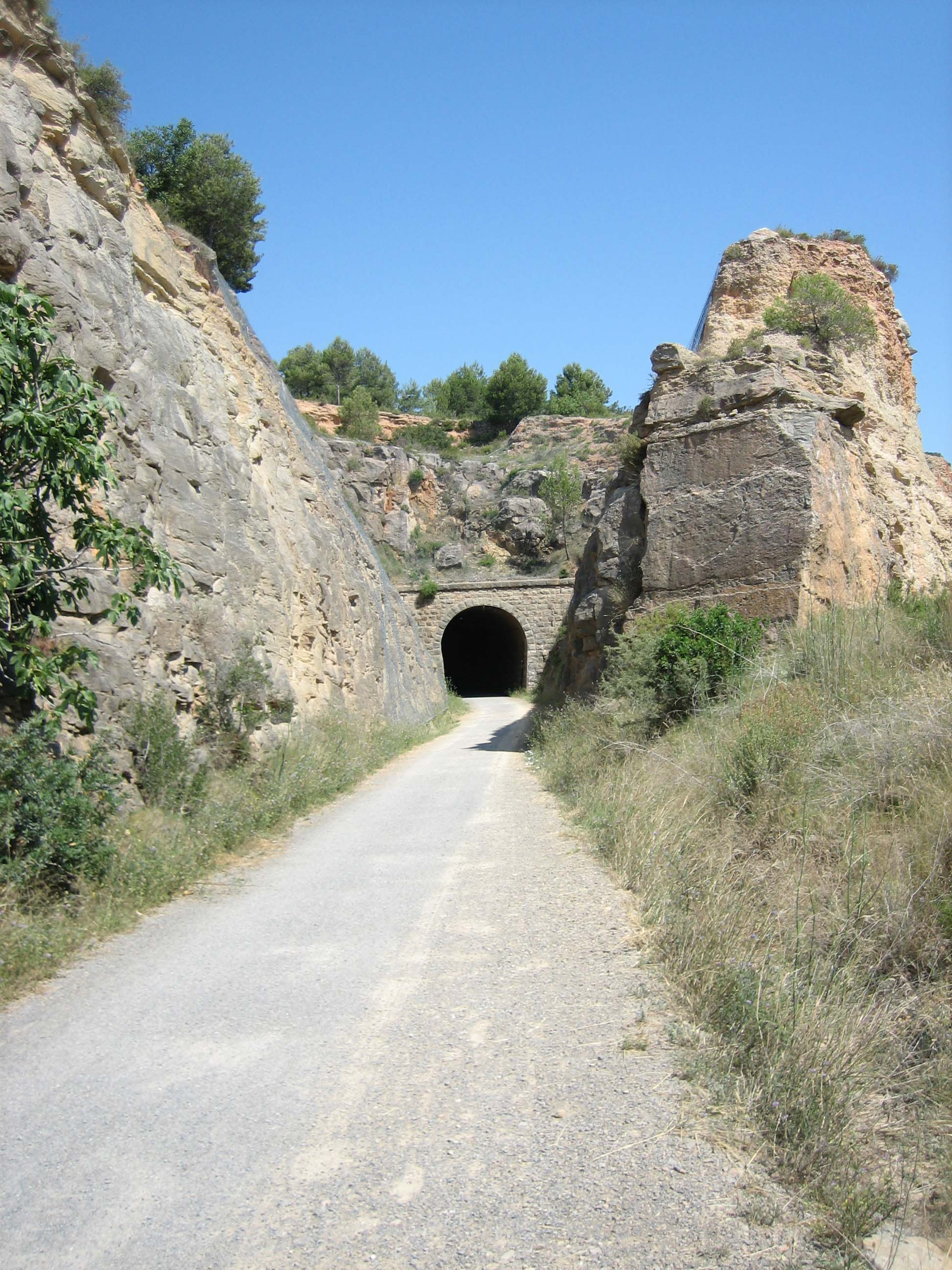
Tunnel on the Via Verde de Ojos Negros near Segorbe.

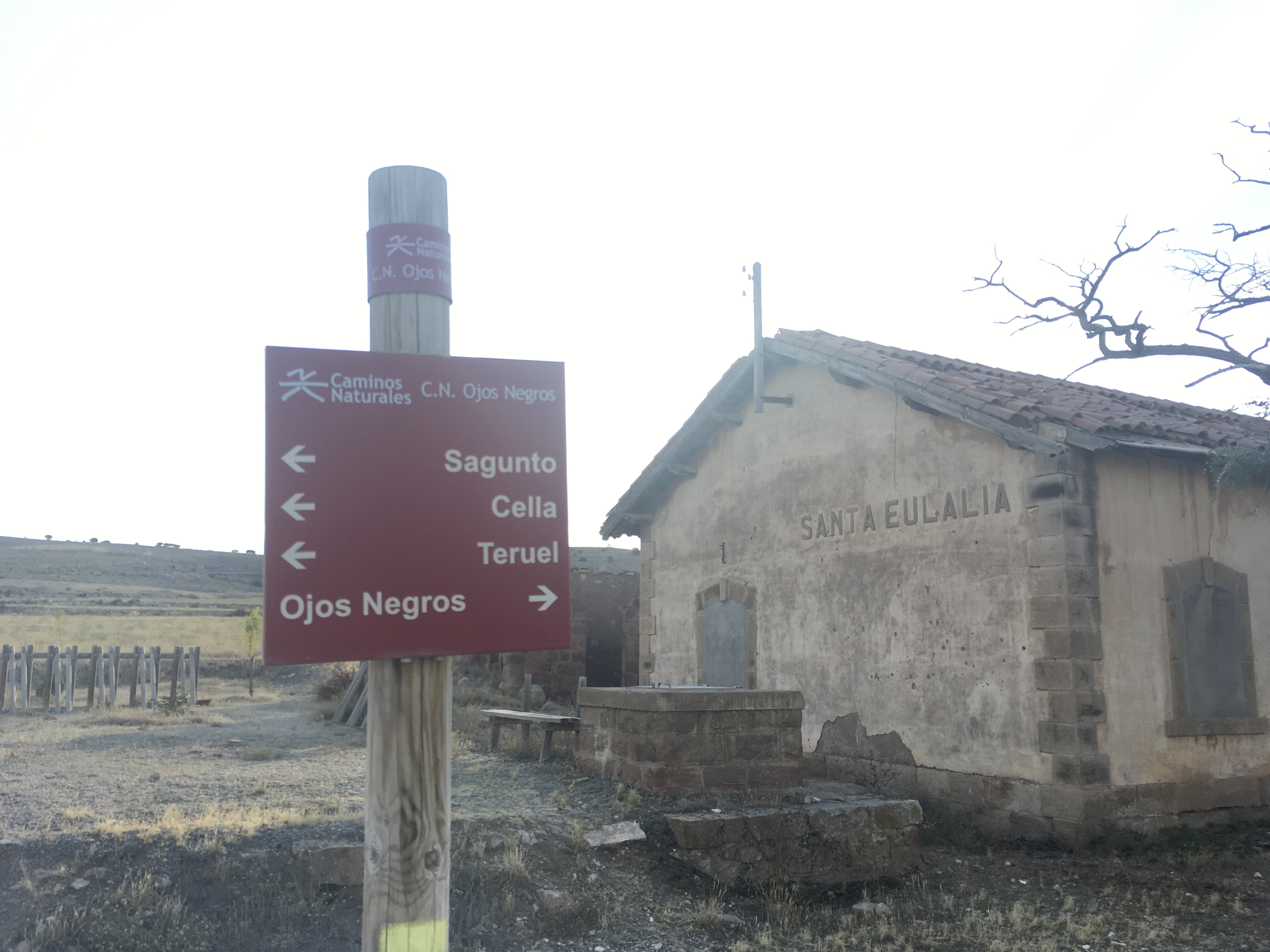
Signage at Santa Eulalia del Campo station.

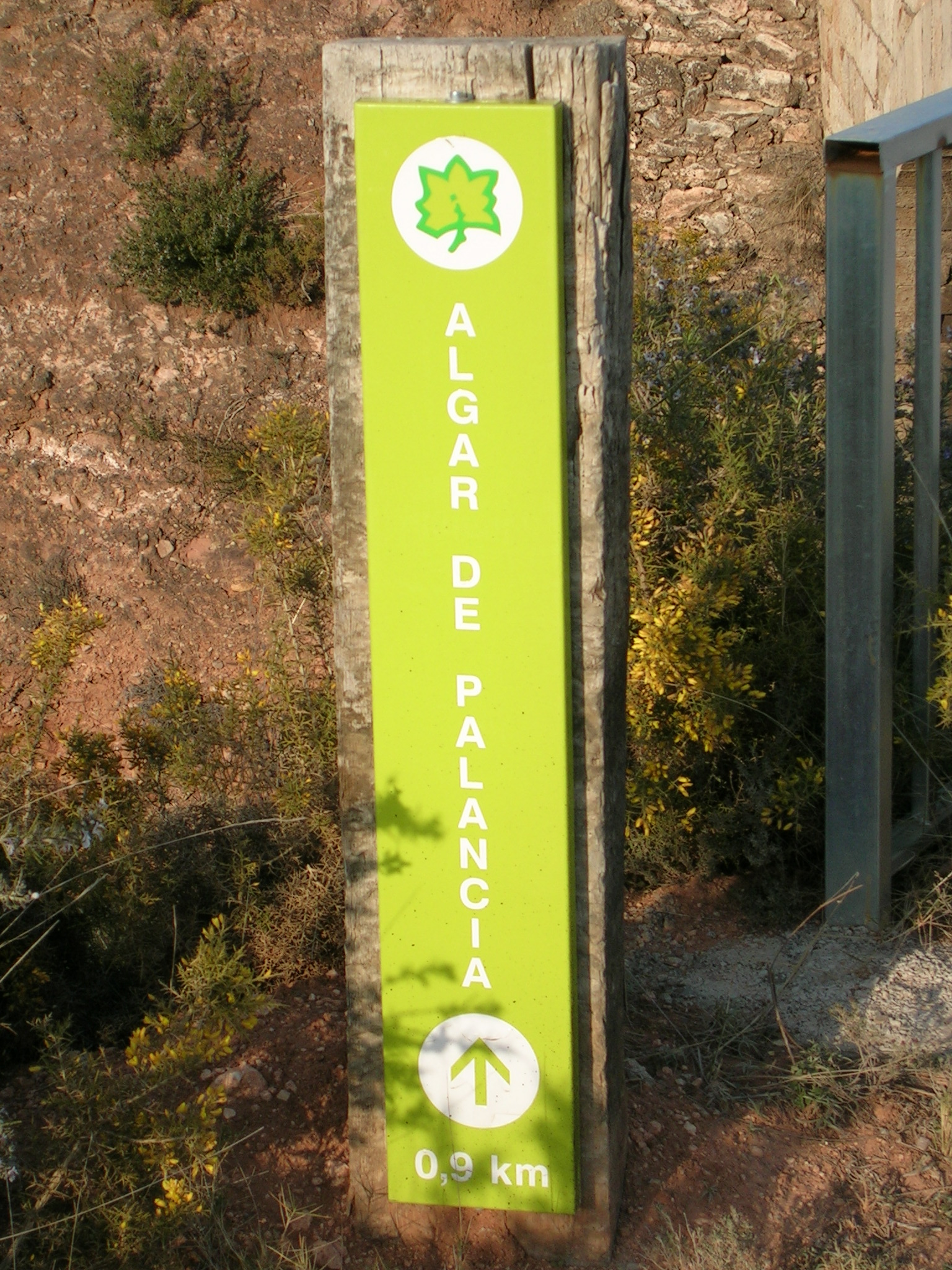
Route marker sign near Algar de Palancia in Valencia.

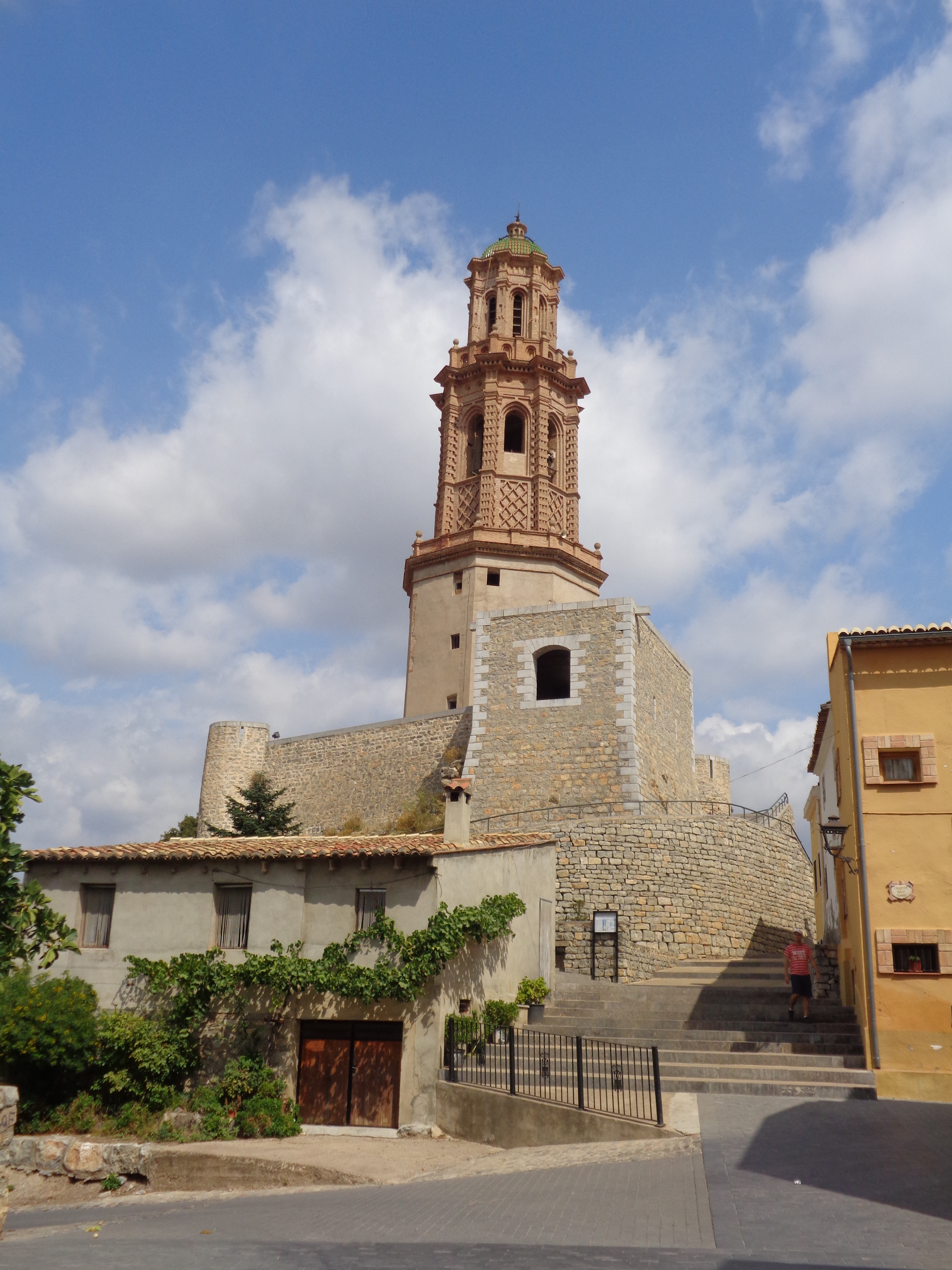
The Mudejar bell tower in Jérica

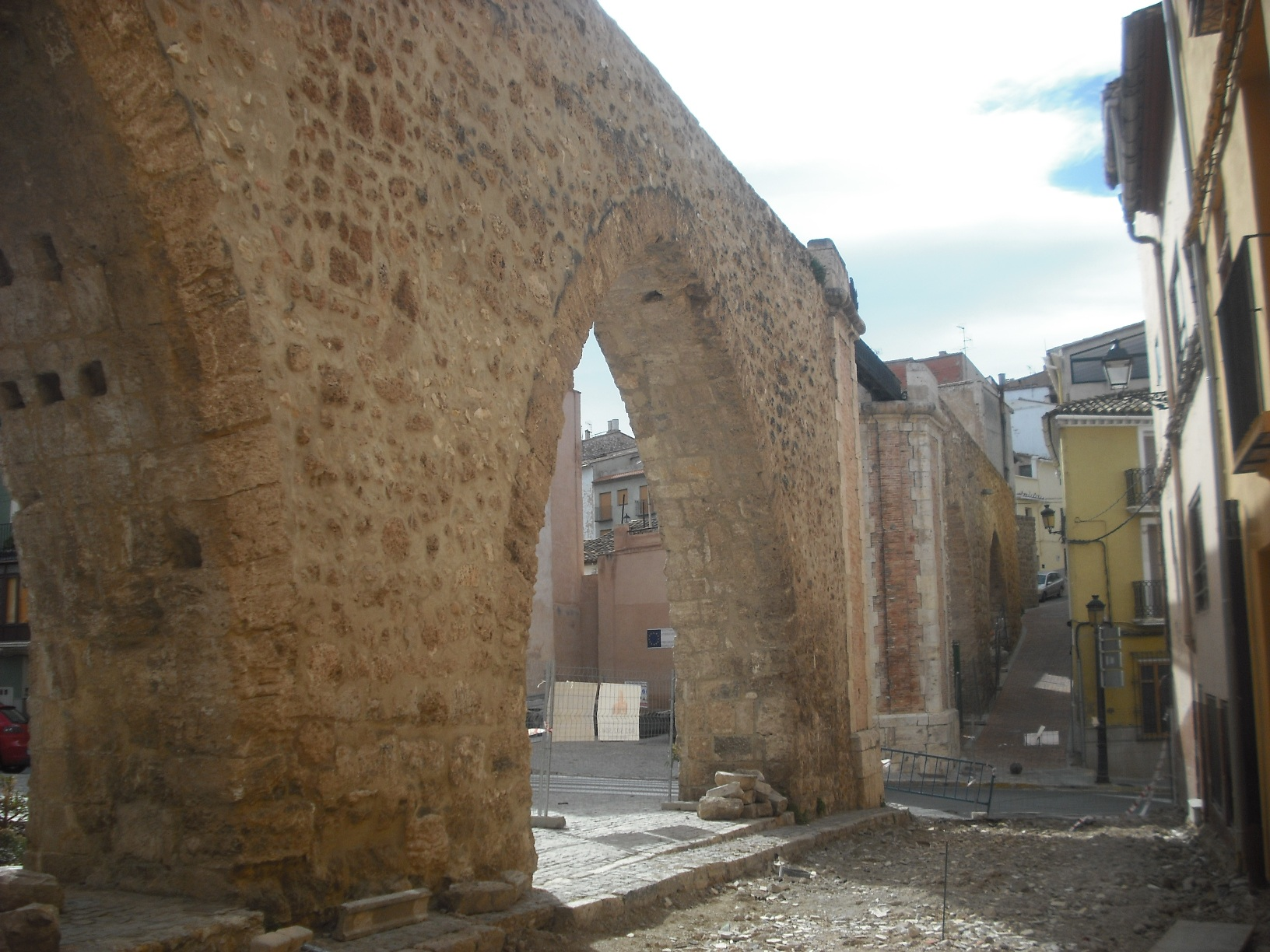
Detail of 14th-century aqueduct in Segorbe

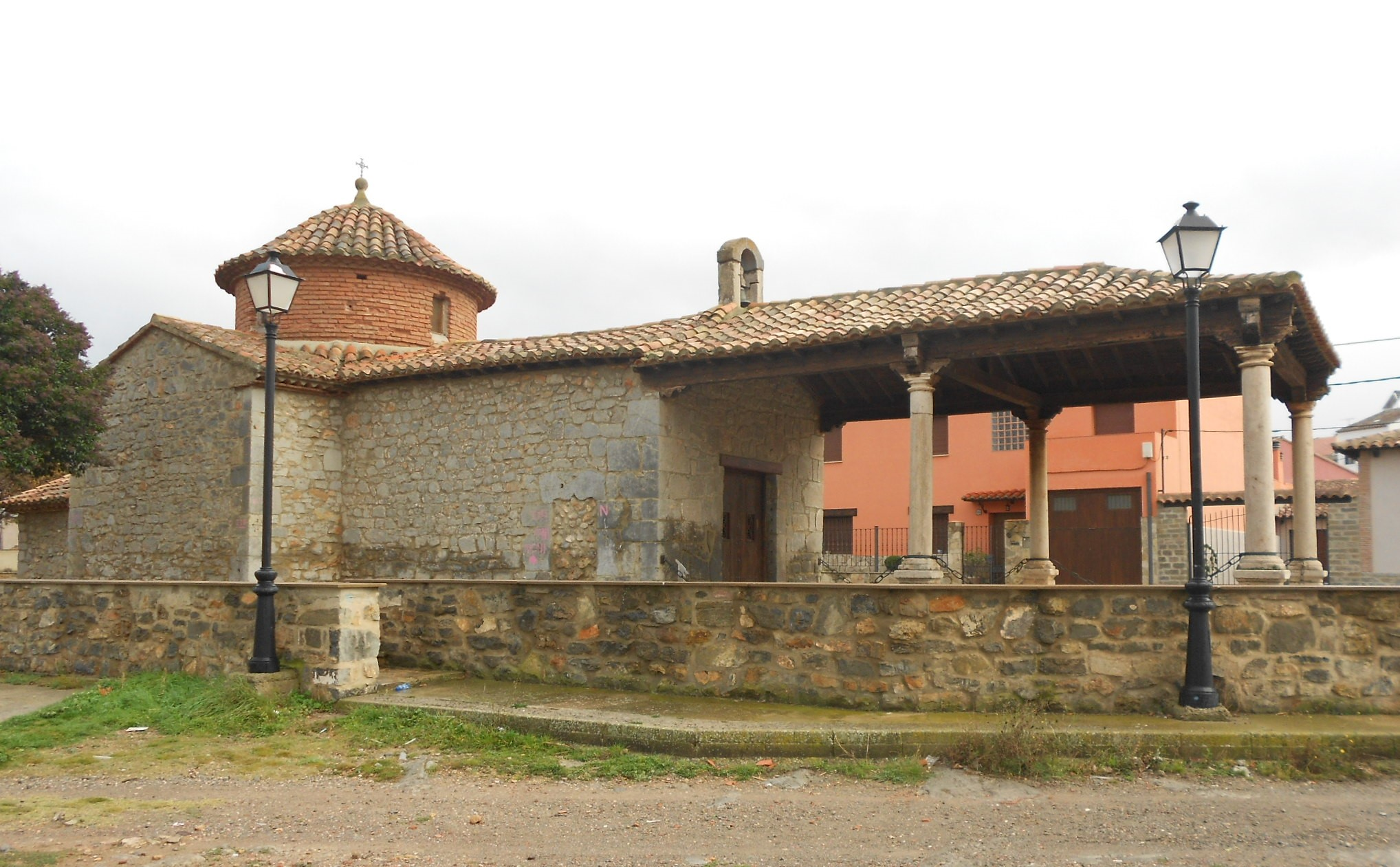
Hermitage of Saint Roch, Albentosa

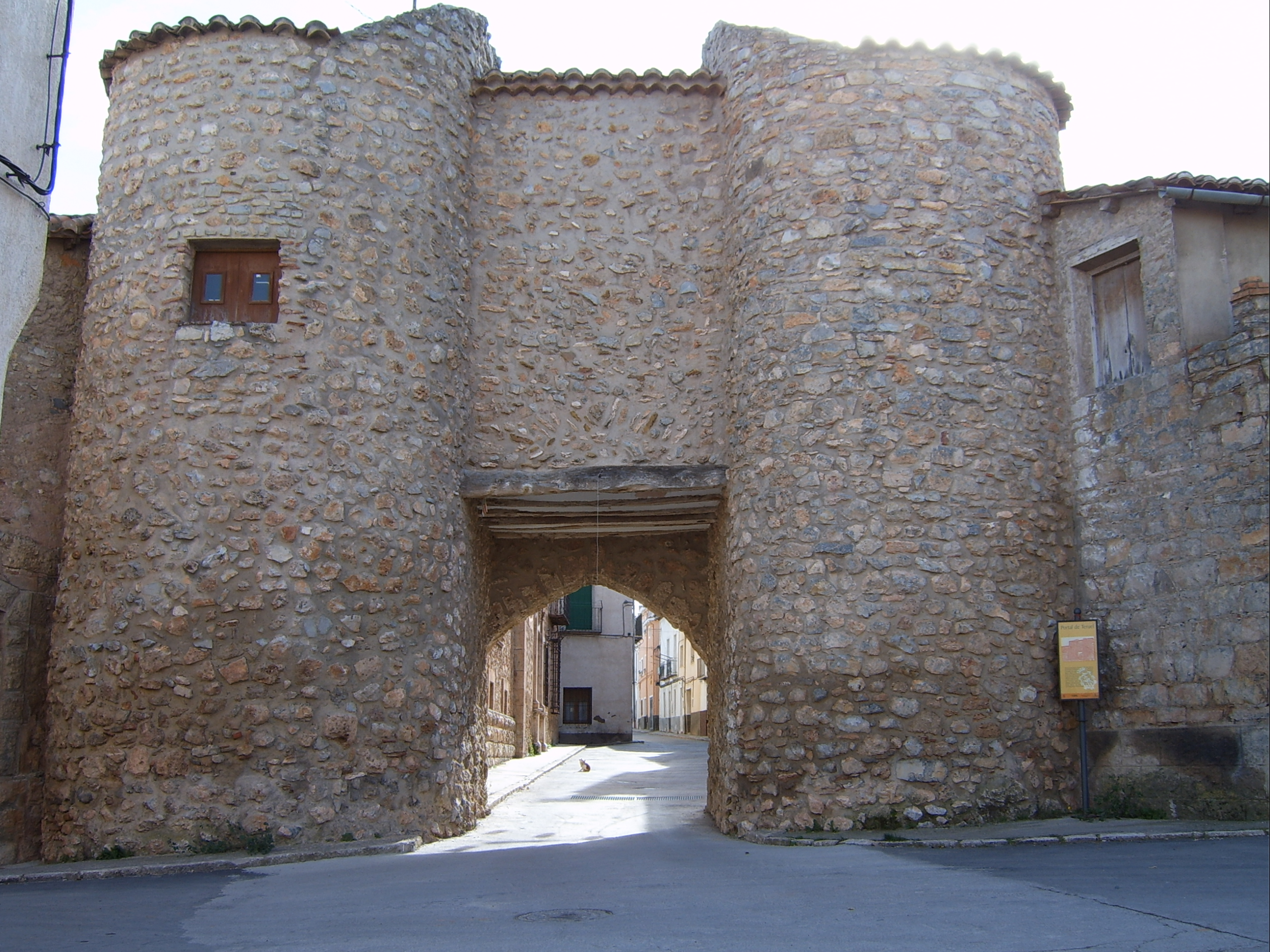
Teruel Gate, Sarrión

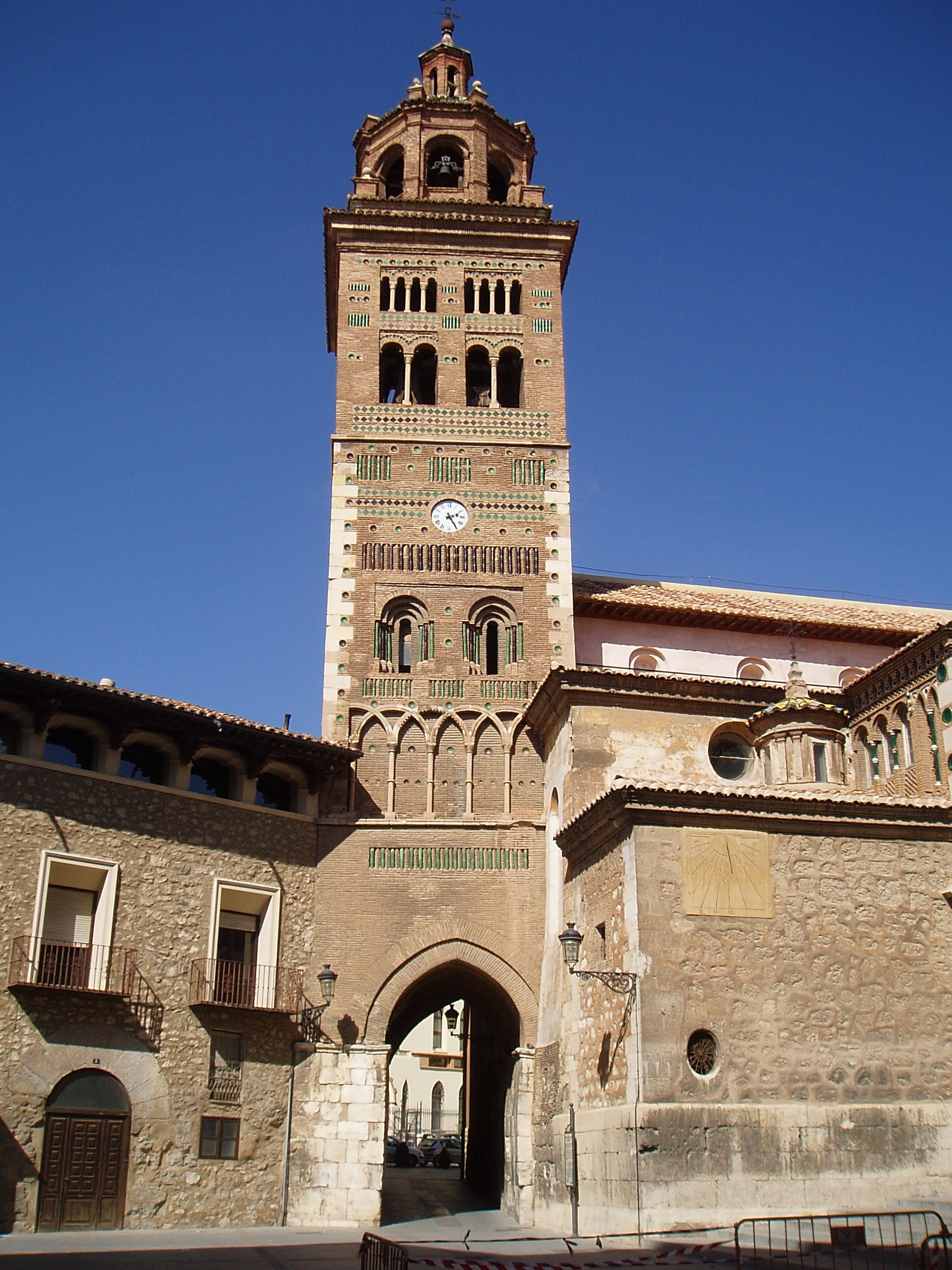
The tower of Teruel Cathedral

== Conversion into rail trail (greenway) ==
In 2001, the Valencian Regional Government decided to convert the stretch of the former railway running from Algimia d'Alfara to Barracas into a rail trail. A similar decision was later taken by the Aragon Regional Government in relation to the stretch of line running within Aragon to the village of Santa Eulalia del Campo.

At the current time, no definitive decision has been taken regarding the conversion of the final stretch of line between Santa Eulalia del Campo and Ojos Negros into a rail trail.

In 2017, the Valencian Regional Government announced plans to connect the Ojos Negros Greenway to the city of Valencia via the extension of the Vía Churra Greenway, which runs from the Valencian capital, to the city of Sagunto and the village of Albalat dels Tarongers The extension project is expected to be finalised in 2020–2021.

== Geography ==
The original railway started in the village of Ojos Negros, in the comarca of Jiloca, at which point it turned southeast, crossing the River Jiloca valley to the provincial capital of Teruel, and then over the Escandón Pass and through the Sierra de Javalambre mountain range to the Valencian Community. Following the Barracas moorlands, the line entered the Sierra Calderona mountain range and commenced a descent of almost 1000 metres to Sagunto, on the Mediterranean coast.

== Route ==
The route of the Ojos Negros rail trail does not follow the former railway in its entirety, mainly as a result of the construction of different buildings and road infrastructure since the closure of the original line. This is especially so in the areas where the former railway coincides with the A-23 motorway in Aragon.

The existing route is divided into two sections:

Ojos Negros I: this section starts in the village of Algimia de Alfara in Valencia and passes through (or close by) the towns of Altura, Segorbe, Jérica, Viver and Caudiel, among others, before finishing in Barracas, the last town in the province of Castellón before entering Teruel. Measuring around 70 kilometres, this section of the route rises around 800 metres, from the Mediterranean to the Meseta Central ("Inner Plateau"),.

The route's surface alternates between asphalt, compacted gravel and earth. The route passes through 15 former railway tunnels and crosses eight bridges and is equipped with various rest areas.

Ojos Negros II: this section starts in Barracas (Castellón) and passes through the municipalities of Sarrión (known as the world truffle capital), La Puebla de Valverde, Teruel and Cella, among others, before finishing in the village of Santa Eulalia del Campo (Teruel). It measures 91 kilometres and crosses the highest point on the Ojos Verdes Greenway, Escandón Pass, located at an altitude of 1218 m.a.s.l., and some 15 kilometres outside the town of Teruel.

The route, which alternates stretches of asphalt with stretches of compacted earth and of ballast, passes through five tunnels and crosses 13 viaducts.

This section of the Via Verde de Ojos Negros has been developed within the Spanish Ministry of Agriculture, Fishing and Food's Natural Trails Programme

In May, 2020, the relevant administrative licences were granted to allow the connection of the Vía Verde de Ojos Negros to the Cantabrian coast, following the route of the planned Santander - Sagunto railway.

=== Signage ===
The Ojos Negros greenway is equipped with abundant Vía Verde kilometre-, direction- and information signs from Algímia d'Alfara to Barracas. As the greenway enters the province of Teruel, the route is equipped with signs belonging to the Spanish Ministry of Agriculture, Fishing and Food's Natural Trails (Caminos naturales) programme.

=== Illumination ===
Certain of the tunnels along the route are equipped with artificial illumination (permanent or motion-sensor activated), although it is recommended that users (and especially cyclists) carry their own lights.

=== Climate ===
The Valencian coastline enjoys a typical hot-summer Mediterranean climate, classified as Csa under the Köppen climate classification and characterised by hot, dry summers and mild, wet winters with infrequent frosts in inland locations.

The province of Teruel is classified as Bsk under Köppen, denoting a cold semi-arid climate with warm to hot summers and dry, cold winters. The highest temperature recorded at the Teruel Observatory is 39.3 °C (August 4, 2007), whilst the lowest is -22.5 °C (December 26, 2001). Snowfall is not unusual during the winter months. Precipitation is lowest in winter (not summer, unlike most of Spain) and highest at the end of spring.

Due to the high summer temperatures in Valencia and the sub-zero temperatures and snowfall often registered in Teruel during the winter, the optimum seasons for completing the route are spring and autumn.

=== Difficulty ===
The Ojos Negros greenway does not present any great difficulties for most users given that, in common with most railway lines, the average gradient is 3-5%, and is considered suitable for walkers, cyclists, horse riders and those with disabilities.

=== Accommodation ===
There are numerous accommodation options available along the Via Verde de Ojos Negros greenway, ranging from hostels and hotels to campsites, cabins and private houses.

== Access ==
As has been noted, in many stretches the rail trail runs parallel to the main Sagunto - Teruel - Zaragoza railway, which has several stations nearby, including: Sagunto, Segorbe, Barracas, Rubielos de Mora, Mora de Rubielos, Sarrión, La Puebla de Valverde, Puerto de Escandón, Teruel, Cella y Santa Eulalia del Campo.

Additionally, the C-5 line of the Valencia local train service stops in Estivella, Algimia de Alfara, Soneja, Segorbe, Navajas, Jérica and Caudiel, all of which are to be found on the first section of the route. (Cyclists are recommended to consult train operator RENFE about possible restrictions on boarding trains with bicycles to avoid any last minute surprises.)

Similarly, the aforementioned A-23 motorway follows the rail trail closely, allowing access via the many villages and towns along the route (for example, Villa de Altura).

== Tourism ==
The route passes through numerous location of architectural interest, including the city of Segorbe, with its cathedral and medieval walls, Jérica, which is host to a múdejar tower that has been declared a national historic-artistic monument, Albentosa, Sarrión, la La Puebla de Valverde y Teruel.

The comarcas which the Ojos Negros I crosses or passes include 18 Protected Natural Areas (Espacios Naturales Protegidos), including Sierra Calderona, Sierra del Espadán and Dehesa de Soneja, as well as Mediterranean pine, oak and juniper forests.

Ojos Negros II passes through or within 5 kilometres of nine protected natural areas (espacios naturales protegidos), including Los Sabinares del Puerto de Escadón, Sierra de Javalambre, Estrechos del Río Mijares, Sierra de Javalambre II, Los Yesares and Laguna de Tortajada and Cueva del Húmero, as well as crossing the valleys of Alfambra and Jiloca
