= Ojos Negros =

Ojos Negros may refer to:

- Ojos Negros, Teruel, a municipality in the province of Teruel, Aragon, Spain
- Vía Verde de Ojos Negros, the longest rail trail in Spain, which runs between the municipality of Ojos Negros in the province of Teruel and the municipality of Algímia d'Alfara in the province of Valencia, Spain
- Ojos Negros, Baja California, a town in the municipality of Ensenada, Baja California, Mexico
- Ojos Negros (Azúcar Moreno album), 1992
- Ojos Negros (Dino Saluzzi album), 2006
