= Castle of Ojos Negros =

Castle in Aragon, Spain

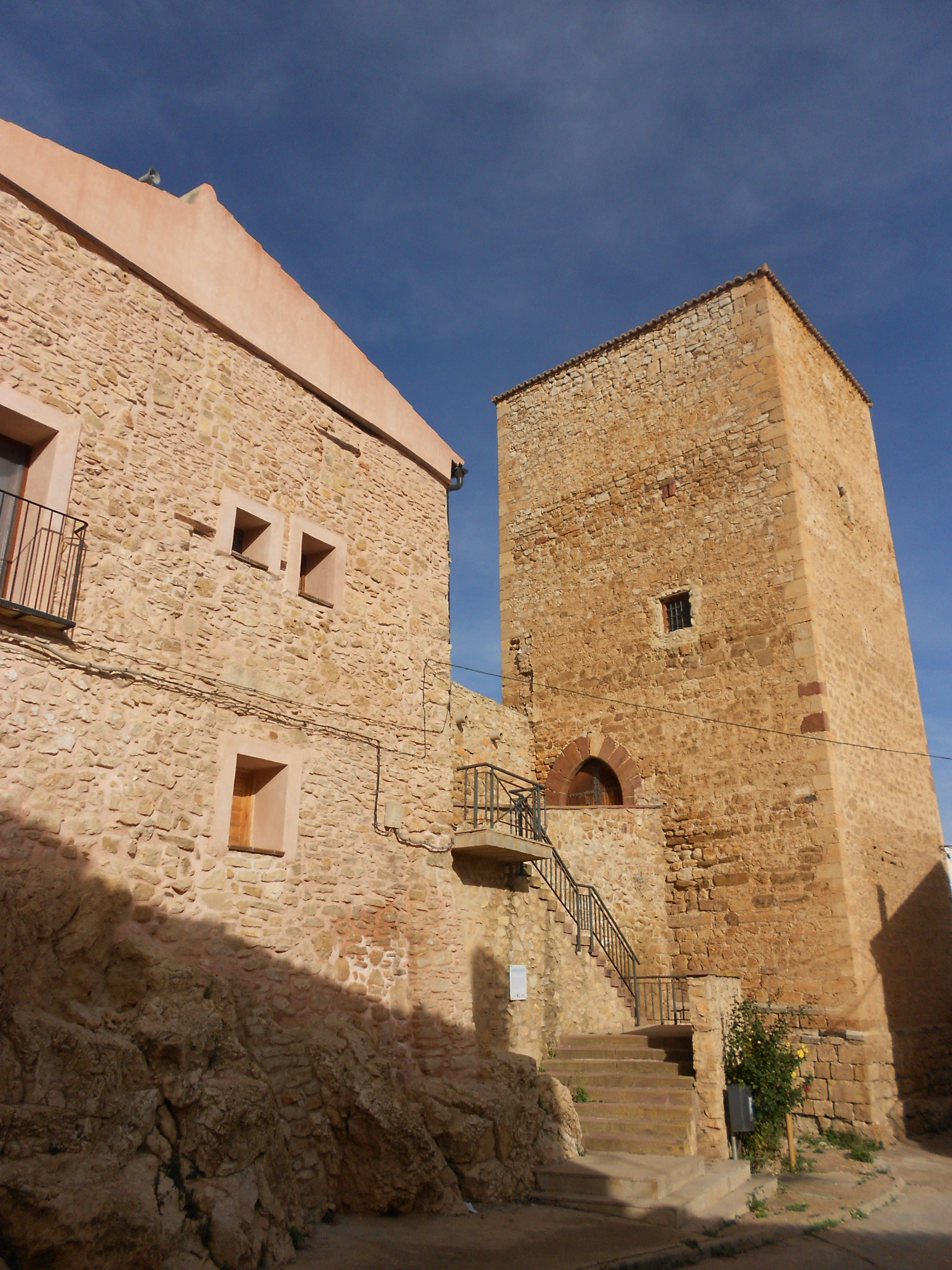

The Castle of Ojos Negros was a castle located in the municipality of Ojos Negros, between the province of Teruel (Aragon) and Guadalajara (Castilla - La Mancha). Ojos Negros is a town belonging to the community of villages of Daroca, Sesma of the Jiloca River. This castle is located in the high part of the village.

== History ==
The castle was built on Iberian archaeological remains. Construction was funded by the community in 1303. This castle was burned by the Spaniards and in the following year was rebuilt. In 1363, the locals lived and took refuge inside it. It held a chapel dedicated to San Juan as well as a large oval plant that was surrounded by the Iberian walls.

== Design ==
The castle had three towers, one of which is currently in ruins, and another which hosts exhibitions. The tower located on the upper level has a stone base on which stands a mud-based, badly damaged body. The second tower built in masonry and mud, is better preserved and is used for housing. This tower has a wall that unites it with the third tower and is located in the lower level of the walled enclosure. The keep is built in masonry and ashlar, and contains saetera In the face that looks towards the intramural opens a gateway with arc providing access to "The Homage Tower", formed by a slightly pointed arch.

== See also ==
- Ojos Negros, Teruel

== Bibliography ==
- Alcañiz Gutiérrez, Ángel. Situación, riqueza, demografía (PDF) (in Spanish).
- Benito Martín, Félix (1991). Inventario arquitectónico (in Spanish). Teruel and Zaragoza.
- Burillo Mozota, Francisco, dir. (1991). Diputación General de Aragón (ed.). Inventario arqueológico (in Spanish). Calamocha and Zaragoza.
- Guitart Aparicio, Cristóbal (1979). Castillos de Aragón. 2:Desde el segundo cuarto del siglo XIII hasta el siglo XIX (in Spanish). Zaragoza.
- Sebastián López, Santiago (1974). Inventario artístico de Teruel y su provincia (in Spanish). Madrid.
