= Barracas =

Barracas may refer to:

- Barracas, Buenos Aires
  - Barracas Central
  - Sportivo Barracas
- Barracas, Castellón, Spain
