= Altos Hornos del Mediterráneo =

Former Spanish metallurgy company

Altos Hornos of Mediterraneo
- Abbreviation: AHM
- Formation: 1971
- Dissolved: January 13, 2004
- Type: S.A. (corporation)
- Headquarters: Madrid
- Location: Spain
- Fields: Ferrous metallurgy

Altos Hornos del Mediterráneo S.A. (AHM) was a Spanish ferrous metallurgy company incorporated in 1971 to operate the integral ferrous metallurgy in Sagunto, known as the 4th Integral Ferrous Metallurgy Plant of Spain. At the time of its creation, it inherited the historical facilities that Altos Hornos de Vizcaya had owned in Sagunto since the beginning of the 20th century. However, the company's activity was strongly affected by the industrial crisis that the country experienced in the 70's and 80's, so that in 1984 the public administration agreed to cease its operations.

== History ==
=== Origins and constitution ===
As early as 1917, a ferrous metallurgy-industrial complex had been built in the Sagunto area by the company Altos Hornos de Vizcaya (AHV). (Note: In 1917, the Compañía Siderúrgica del Mediterráneo (Sáez García & Díaz Morlán (2009, p. 28)) was incorporated in Bilbao as a subsidiary of AHV to operate these facilities.) During the 40s and 50s this complex was supplied with iron that the Compañía Minera de Sierra Menera (CMSM) extracted from the Ojos Negros mines and that reached the Port of Sagunto through the Ojos Negros mining railroad. It also used iron ore from Minas del Rif.

Since the end of the 1970s AHV bet on the realization of the project of the 4th Integral Ferrous Metallurgy Plant, which was agreed to be located in Sagunto, within the historical industrial complex of AHV. At that time, the ore came from Sierra Menera and Minas de Alquife. For this purpose, in 1971 the public limited company Altos Hornos del Mediterráneo (AHM) was created, to which shortly afterwards Franco's government awarded the execution of the 4th Integral Ferrous Metallurgy Plant. The new company was constituted from the facilities of AHV port of Sagunto and in its creation participated companies such as Altos Hornos de Vizcaya or U.S. Steel, as well as a group of banks and savings banks.

The incorporation of the company took place at a time of expanding demand for ferrous metallurgy products in Spain. In 1972 there was a 19.2% increase in steel consumption compared to 1971 figures. Although 1971 had a particularly low demand for steel, the trend was upward and investment in the sector was significant. For Spain as a whole, it amounted to some 14.5 billion peseta per year. The National Ferrous Metallurgy Program, revised in 1971, foresaw a per capita consumption in 1975 of 358 kilograms, a figure similar to that of France in 1967. However, events were not to develop according to forecasts.

=== Impact of the crisis ===
The economic crisis of 1973 led to a crisis in the ferrous metallurgy industry in 1975 which affected the company, which suffered increasing losses and had to be restructured. Already in 1974 there were pessimistic signs: year-on-year growth in domestic steel consumption had fallen by 7.3%, to which should be added a growing stock of product. In 1976 a cold rolling mill was added.

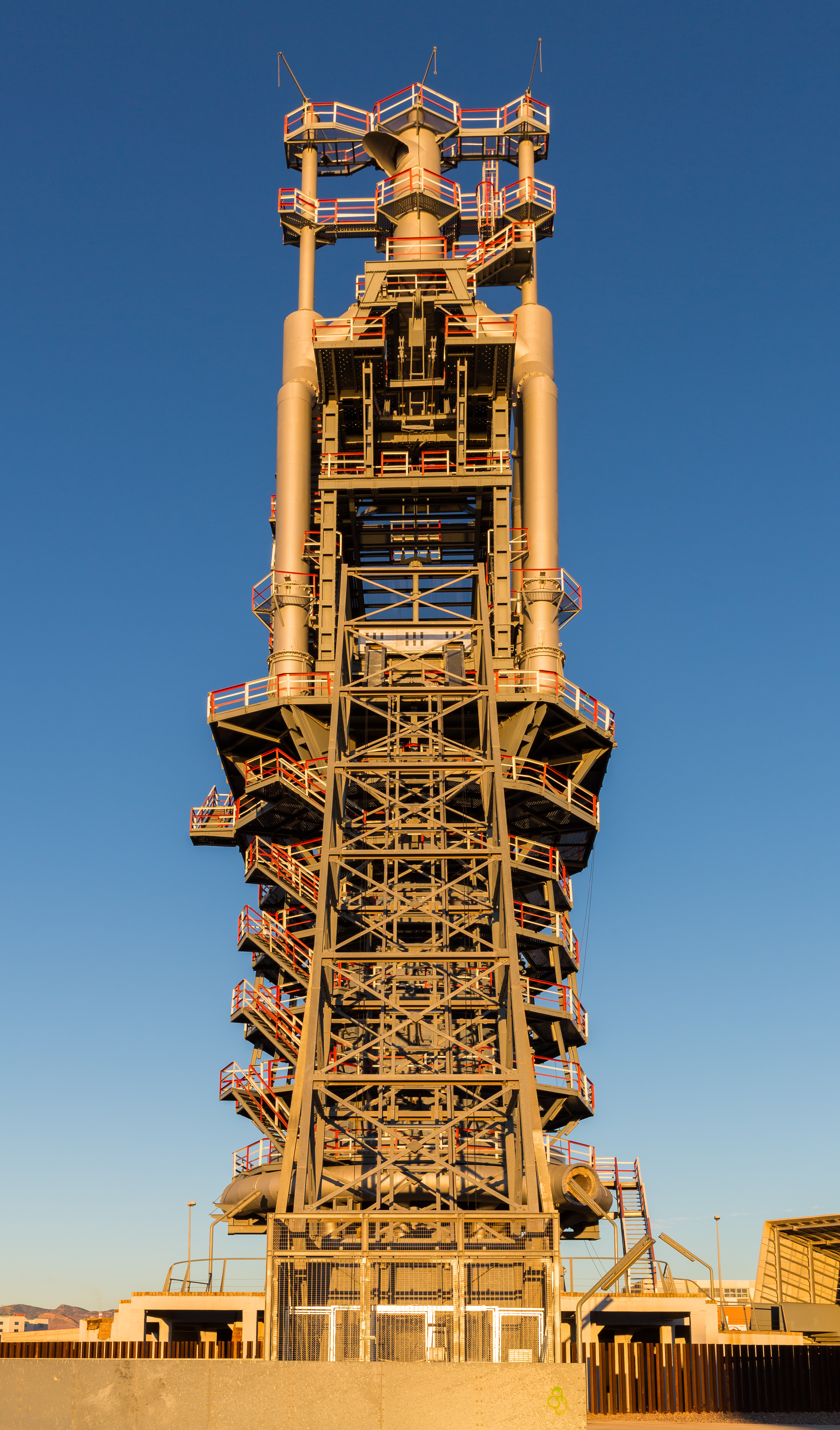
Blast furnace # 2.

Year	Losses (millions of pesetas)
1977	3 568
1978	6 597
1979	6 983
1980	7 797
1981	8 830
1982	8 948
Source: Ramón Tamamés	

The impact of the crisis led Altos Hornos del Mediterráneo to accumulate losses of 3,568 million pesetas in 1977, making expansion plans and even the payment of payrolls difficult (those for the third quarter of 1977 were paid only in January 1978). At the end of December 1977, Ignacio Hidalgo de Cisneros was appointed president of Altos Hornos del Mediterráneo and Claudio Boada was appointed to the same position in Altos Hornos de Vizcaya. In this way, both companies were separated in their management, since they had shared the same president.

On December 23, 1978, Law 60/78 "of urgent measures to support the ferrous metallurgy sector" was enacted. With it, the National Institute of Industry acquired a shareholding in the company. This plan proved to be insufficient and in 1979 INI was left as the sole shareholder. In 1980 the Spanish ferrous metallurgy sector lost 38 billion pesetas and the forecast for 1981 was even worse. This situation led to the drafting of Royal Decree 878/1981, of May 8, 1981, establishing the "Plan for the Restructuring of the sector". Of the 229,750 million pesetas foreseen for the Integral Financial Reorganization Plan for the Iron and Ferrous Metallurgy Industry in the period 1981–1985, 33,173 million pesetas were destined to AHM.

RD 878/1981 also turned out to be insufficient, mainly due to the problem of the location of the hot strip mill (Spanish: tren de bandas en caliente, TBC). This installation was to be located in only one of the three ferrous metallurgy companies, which were also located in different autonomous communities: Altos Hornos de Vizcaya in the Basque Country, Ensidesa in Asturias and Altos Hornos del Mediterráneo in the Valencian Community. To resolve the location of the TBC, the coordinating commission of the integrated steel industry, made up of representatives of the Government and the steel companies, contracted the Kawasaki company to prepare a study for the restructuring of the sector. The Kawasaki Report recommended locating TBC in Sagunto. On the other hand, it did not recommend the continuous casting steel mills of Ensidesa and Altos Hornos de Vizcaya. This provoked a strong response in Asturias and the Basque Country, and led to the failure of the Coordinating Commission to reach an agreement.

=== Disappearance ===
The Government's decision was reflected in a new Royal Decree, RD 1853/1983. This document authorized the modification of the hot strip trains of Ensidesa and AHV, not establishing the one recommended by the Kawasaki Report in Sagunto.

On February 4, 1983, the Council of Ministers decreed the closure of the 4th Plant, with the dismantling of the blast furnaces, but keeping the rolling mill. On February 8, Segundo Bru, Councilor for Industry of the Generalitat Valenciana, obtained from the Government a provisional suspension of the measure. General strikes took place in Sagunto on February 10, 12 and 16. The conflict persists in March, after the Minister of Industry, Carlos Solchaga, announces the Government's intention to continue with the closures of facilities at Ensidesa, AHV and AHM. During the electoral campaign for the municipal elections of May 8, 1983, protests continued, such as those which took place on April 27 before an electoral act of the PSOE, the party which at that time held the state, regional and municipal governments. New strikes would follow after the municipal elections: June 14, 15, 22, 27 and 30; and July 5 and 14. On September 9, the company's management informed the Works council that train number 28 of structural rolling mills would no longer be put into operation. In spite of this, during the following days the workers put it into operation. As a result of this action, 82 employees were dismissed, although the pressure exerted by the Ministry of Industry on the central government prevented the dismissal from taking effect.

In spite of the dissatisfaction of the people of Sagunto and the acts of protest —fifteen general strikes in 1983, blocking of the AP7 highway, demonstrations, lock-in of the municipal council— on December 15, the Minister of Industry announced the closure of blast furnace number two for the 21st of the same month, as well as a redundancy plan as a consequence. Days later, as part of the reindustrialization plan —Sagunto had been classified as a Zone of Preferential Industrial Location— the Ministry announced the installation of several companies.

On February 2, 1984, there was a day of protest in various Spanish industrial sectors in support of the AHM workers. On April 4, 1984, an agreement was reached between INI, the UGT and CCOO unions and the Works Committee of Altos Hornos del Mediterráneo for the closure of the head plant of the Sagunto ferrous metallurgy without any layoffs. The activity ceased on October 5, 1984. In 1984 its turnover amounted to 28,323 million pesetas and it employed 3,332 workers. The rolling mill was the basis for a new company: Siderúrgica of Mediterraneo.

The company Altos Hornos del Mediterráneo S.A. was dissolved on January 13, 2004.

== Bibliography ==
- Hernández, Ricardo (2007). Vías verdes de la Comunitat Valenciana (in Spanish). Valencia: Carena Editors.
- Sáez García, Miguel Ángel; Díaz Morlán, Pablo (2009). El puerto del acero: historia de la siderurgia de Sagunto (1900–1984) (in Spanish). Madrid: Marcial Pons Historia. ISBN 978-84-92820-08-5.
- Van Geert, Fabien; Roigé, Xavier; Conget, Lucrecia (2017). Usos políticos del patrimonio cultural (in Spanish) (Ediciones Universidad de Barcelona ed.).
