= Peracense =

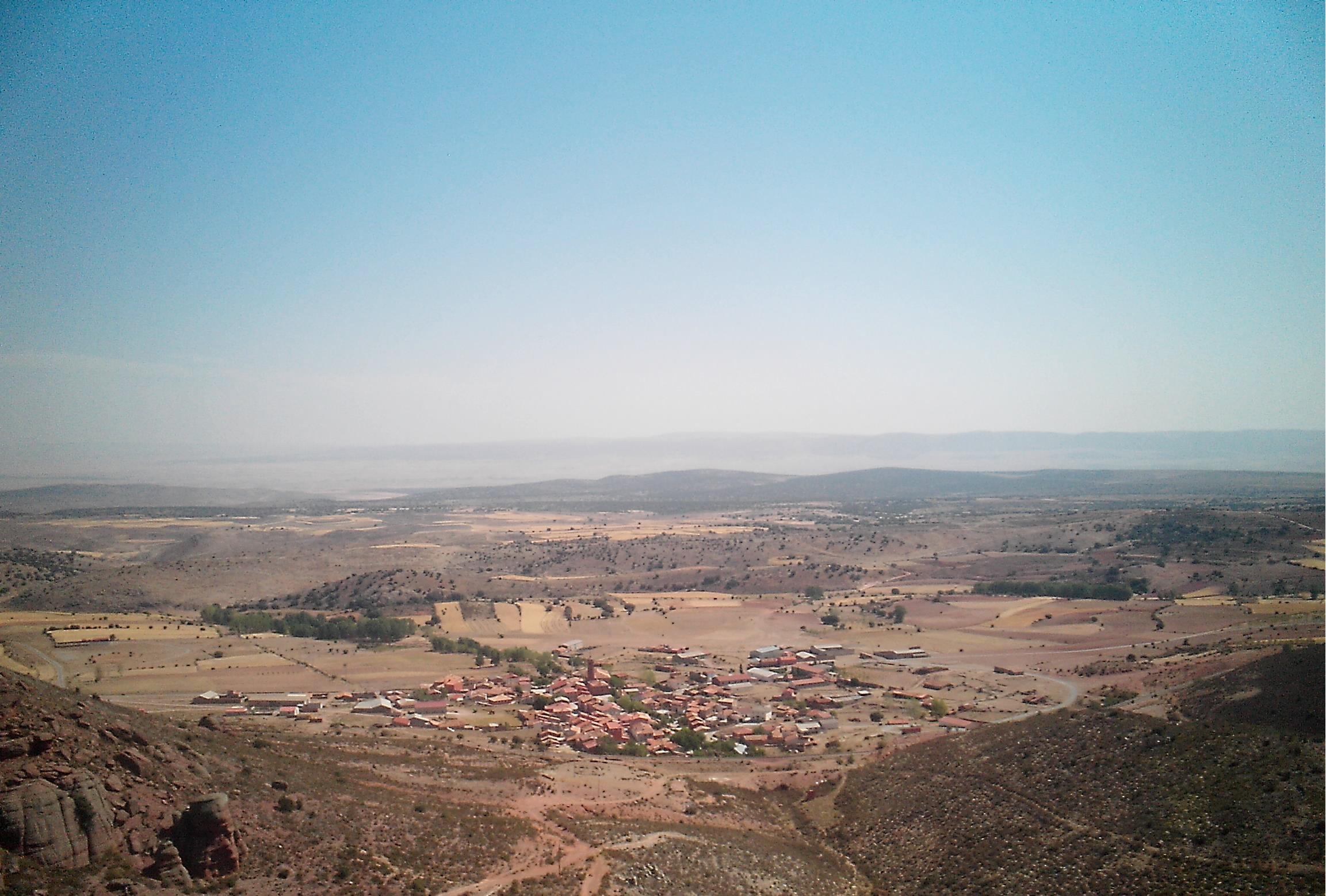

- Flag Coat of arms

- Location within Spain
- Coordinates: 40°38′30.41″N 1°28′10.06″W
- Country: Spain
- Autonomous community: Aragon
- Province: Teruel
- Comarca: Jiloca

Government
  - Mayor: Manuel Bugeda Doñate

Area
  - Total: 28.66 km^{2} (11.07 sq mi)
- Elevation: 1,217 m (3,993 ft)

Population (2025-01-01)
  - Total: 68
  - Density: 2.4/km^{2} (6.1/sq mi)
- Time zone: UTC+1 (CET)
  - Summer (DST): UTC+2 (CEST)

Peracense is a town in the province of Teruel, Aragon, on the north-east of Spain. It is located 51 kilometres from Teruel, the capital province.

It is home to a medieval castle, the main attraction. However, Peracense also has other cultural and natural heritage.

== Geography ==
Placed in the western end of the province of Teruel, Peracense is the most southern town of Jiloca Region. Its 28.7 km^{2} of his municipal area border in the north with Villar del Salz; in the east with Villafranca del Campo; in the south with Almohaja and in the west with Ródenas (Region of Sierra de Albarracín).

The local roads TE-58 and TE-V-9024 make the principal way to arrive to the town. Both roads allow the access to the highway A-23 -principal communication axis of the region-, whether you reach it through Villafranca del Campo or through Santa Eulalia del Campo.

== History ==
The most ancient settlers in Peracense, at least as there are evidences, are from the Iberian Period. Archaeological sites, such as El Palomar -placed in a surrounding area of the current urban town center-, testifies this statement. The remainders in the castle, -where fragments of Iberian ceramics were found-, can also indicate the presence of human settlement previous to the construction of the fortress.

It is known that the first documentary reference to Peracense's existence is dated in 1220 in the Cartulario de Aliaga. This document contains transcriptions of several original documents relative to the foundation of the Order of the Temple (Latin: Pauperes commilitones Christi Templique Salomonici), commonly known as the Knights Templar, in this place. In this documents, Peracense is highlighted as a geographical limit.

Peracense belonged to the family and inheritors of Juan Jiménez de Urrea until 1336, who sold the village, as well as the close town of Almohaja, to the Community of Daroca's Villages, joining both of them to the Rio Jiloca's Town Association from this precise moment. When the Community of Villages broke up, Peracense belonged successively to the Sobrecullida of Daroca (1488-1495), to the vereda de Daroca (1646) and to the Corregimiento of Daroca (1711-1833). In 1785 Peracense is considered to be an independent village, having this status until 1834 when the Local Government is founded, firstly associated to the Albarracín's Administrative area and then, in 1965, to the Teruel's Administrative Area.

== Socioeconomic structure ==
Traditionally, Peracense's socioeconomic structure has been narrowly linked to the agricultural activity, very important in the town and the region on these days.

== Population ==
According to the census review on January 1, 2009, the population of Peracense was 93 inhabitants, which gives barely a three inhabitants/km^{2} population density. This population numbers and the resultant population pyramid is the reflection of a very aged demographic structure. As an example, 50% of the population is over 65 years old, which clarifies the number of 60 years old average age at this moment.

This demographic structure is a direct consequence of the rural population exodus who took place in the second half of the 20th century and who concerned the whole interior regions in Spain. In fact, in 1930 the population of Peracense managed to reach 455 inhabitants, its historical maximum, losing since then almost 80% of its total workforce.

Nowadays, the local government and the region of Jiloca are working actively to revitalize the demographic and socioeconomic structure of the town, taking part in programs of demographic promotion, collaborating also with the Association of Entities for the Population of Teruel (HABITATE) and the Aragonese Association of Towns and Regions against the Depopulation.

== Economic activities ==
Traditionally, the local economic base has been almost exclusively agricultural and livestock activities. With just over 1,000 hectares used for crops -almost 36% of the total town area-, the village has 19 agricultural farms, -according to the latest agricultural census-, all of them family business. In this regard, we can highlight the winter cereal crop production (wheat, barley, etc.).

In addition to the agricultural activities, many of the farms in the village include a livestock orientation. Thus, the town livestock rounds 1,500 heads, 1,300 of them sheep.

In regard to other economic activities in the territory, the town has 16 economic activities registered, distributed on the energy field (1 activity), construction (3) and services (12).

The revitalization of the socioeconomic structure runs towards the enhancement of Peracense tourist attractions, especially its excellent medieval-castle, but also with the broadcasting of its environmental and landscape values.

== Culture ==
=== Feast ===
Fiestas de San Gines in honor of the patron of the town (August 25) and the Virgin of the Villeta (August 26).

=== Cultural activities ===
All early August since 2006, Peracense's castle is the scene of groups encounter who recreate the Medieval era. The aim of this event is to recreate the life on the castle around 1210, the moment in which the Peracense's fortress was the border with the Muslim Kingdom of Valencia.

During the four-day meeting, the castle comes to life, being enabled several of its units as forge, kitchen, guard hall or chapel by the different attending groups.

In the 2010 edition attended the event 15 groups from Spain and Portugal, with around a hundred characters perfectly outfitted, dressed and armed with the specific tools of the medieval times.

The party, organized by the turolense group Regi Fidelis, has its own rules known as the "Code of Peracense", a document where the historical context recreation is described, as well as is also specified the dresses, the characteristics that must have the camp or the rules to follow while staging the battles. The purpose is to make the event, staging and their actions as faithful as possible.

== Natural heritage ==
Track GR-24 as part of the extension of the GR-90, GR-24 runs through Iberian Aragonés Mountains from Aldehuela de Liestos to Peracense, connecting also with the Track GR-10, which leads us to the Albarracín and Javalambre Mountains.

The Gallocanta lake, considered one of the most important wetlands in Europe and a winter home of large numbers of migratory birds.

The GR-24 track has seven small tours that organize a 200 km network of trails and connects in Peracense with the GR-10 (Sierra de Albarracin-Sierra Javalambre).

== Cultural heritage ==
=== The castle of Peracense ===
The Castle in Peracense has to be regarded as one of the most important and best preserved in the south of Aragon, located in the mountains of Sierra Menera. Its historical significance resides in being a strategic bulwark against the nearby Kingdom of Castile and natural transit point between the cities of Daroca and Teruel, two of the largest human settlements in the Kingdom of Aragon in medieval times. In ancient documents is named Pietra Solez, dating its existence from the late 13th century, but most of the buildings belong to the 14th century.

The castle is situated close to the Hill of San Gines, and settled on a spur of rodeno rock, with nearly a perfect camouflage.

Its average elevation is 1365 meters above the sea and its coordinates are: latitude, 40° 38' 30", longitude 02° 13' 05" (Madrid Meridian).

==== History ====
The origin of the castle is not completely clear. The archaeological remains found in its vicinity indicate that this area should be the defense of a small medieval town, known by locals as the Villeta, place where the medieval image of the Virgin and Child proceed, preserved nowadays in the parochial church in the town. According to information managed by Christopher Guitart, the building already existed in 1284, used by the royal troops as a starting point for the conquest of Albarracin. However, archeological Celts and Romans remains were also found, which gives us an overall idea of its ancestral origin. The fortress itself, the one we can see nowadays, was built in the first half of the 14th century for military use.

Despite its location, as it is much closer to the city of Teruel than Daroca, and just on the border during the Middle Ages that separated the territories of both communities, the Castle was administered by governors designated by the community of Daroca. The castle is located at the mountain or rock of San Ginés, a strategic Teruel's geographical landmark, which territories were conquered by the troops of Daroca to the Muslim.

The castle in Peracense, like other neighboring castles, was the result of rivalry between the medieval kingdoms of Castile and Aragon. Its mission was to control one of the possible access points where the Castilian troops could enter in Aragon in times of conflict, and to prevent their arrival in the Valley of Jiloca and all its main towns such as Santa Eulalia, Villafranca, Monreal del Campo or the city of Teruel. However, it seems that access of the Castilian troops could be from other nearby points, more difficult to be defended, and for this reason this castle was barely attacked and besieged.

One reason to explain the lack of use of this castle is that it always was properly protected by other defensive elements of the environment. On one hand, the rectangular tower rising in the aforementioned hill of San Ginés, the main visual control point due to its location on a high land elevation with an environment eminently plain. On the other hand, we have the castle of Ródenas, a great unknown building that served the castle of Perancense as a shield. The most obvious evidence of this statement is that there are no remains of a wall at the top in the castle of Ródenas, while the remains of the castle in Peracense have always being more important, even before the recent restoration. Due to Ródenas' castle belonged to the Community of Teruel, another possibility can be considered: both castles were kept to protect the possessions of their respective Communities on sporadic conflicts between them, rather than defend Aragón of raids part from the kingdom of Castile.

==== Description ====
This fortress consists of three concentric enclosures set on red sandstone outcrops (micaceous of buntsandstein), which were partially chopped and modified to improve the defense. This sandstone (Rodeno), as megaliths, as ashlar, or as masonry walls settled with lime mortars or gypsum, is the mainly used material in the construction of the walls on this fortress. The wood was used to a lesser extent and always in beams and putlogs. The natural and intricate terrain secured the defense of the east and north flanks, and for that reason is why the Keep Tower (Torre del Homenaje) is erected in this area. On the west and south sides of the castle two high and thick walls with battlement were built. In the first enclosure, still remain two central elements of the castle: a cistern and two towers. In the second square, enclosed by an imposing wall three meters thick built at right angles, with a side of 70 and another 40 meters, the Weapon Square was established.

==== Condition ====
The Castle has been extensively renovated. This restoration has brought life to a building that was mortally wounded, and had to be largely rebuilt. What was before was more than significant, and restorers had complete and original testimony of every part of the castle, for example the battlements.

The castle has a museum with replicas of many archaeological pieces collected in the excavations, and has a souvenir shop expressly designed for the castle, open to the public since the early days of July 2002.

==== Protection ====
The Castle is under the protection of the General Declaration of the Decree of April 22, 1949, and Law 16/1985 on Spanish Historical Heritage.

=== Church of San Pedro ===
Dated in 1740, the Church of San Pedro has a basilica floor plan with three naves inside built in several sections. The transept is covered with a dome over pendentives. Built in concrete and masonry, the outside has a single volume with a hip roof. The tower, has two sections, the first one quadrangular, while the second has rounded corners and is decorated with Ionic pilasters.

=== Town Hall ===
Is a two-level building built in masonry. Downstairs can be seen the old fish market, consisting of two masonry lowered arches.

== See also ==
- List of municipalities in Teruel

== Sources ==
- https://web.archive.org/web/20131019212634/http://www.weblandia.com/castillos/cdecreto.htm
- https://web.archive.org/web/20130618201821/http://www.peracense.es/InternetRural/peracense/home.nsf/documento/saludo_del_alcalde
