= Castle of Peracense =

Castle in Peracense, Aragon, Spain

Coordinates: 40.6370°N 1.4805°W

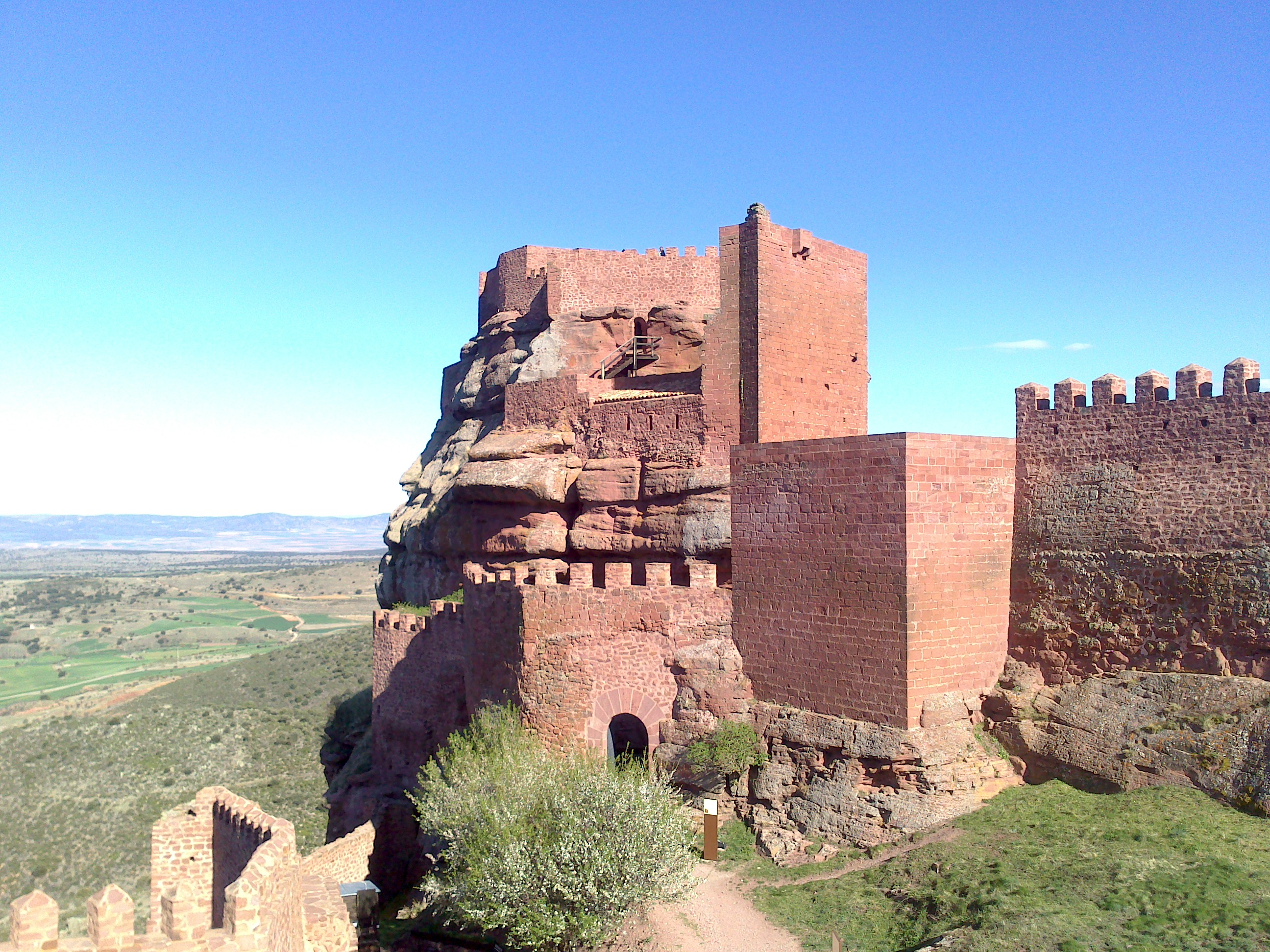
Castle of Peracense.

The Castle of Peracense is a castle in Peracense, Aragon, northern Spain.

The castle was built on an escarpment at the southern end of the Sierra Menera range. The location was occupied since the late Bronze Age, and was later reused during the Moorish domination of Spain, in the 10th and 11th centuries. During the late Middle Age its strategical importance rose, due to its position between the Kingdom of Castile and the Kingdom of Aragon.

The castle was enlarged and renewed in the 14th century.
