= Antonio Mateu Lahoz =

Spanish football referee (born 1977)

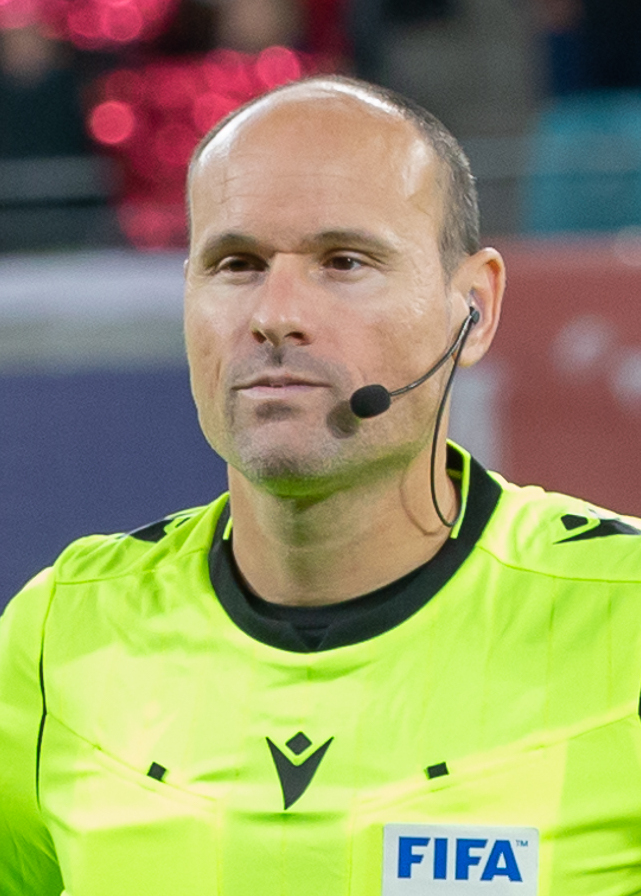
- Mateu Lahoz in 2019
- Full name: Antonio Miguel Mateu Lahoz
- Born: 12 March 1977 (age 49); Algímia d'Alfara, Valencia, Spain
- Other occupation: Physical education teacher

Domestic
Years	League	Role
1999–2002	(Spain) Tercera División	Referee
2002–2004	(Spain) Segunda División B	
2004–2008	(Spain) Segunda División	
2008–2023	(Spain) La Liga	

International
Years	League	Role
2011–2023	FIFA listed	Referee

Antonio Miguel Mateu Lahoz (Spanish pronunciation: [anˈtonjo miˈɣel maˈtew laˈoθ]; born 12 March 1977) is a Spanish retired association football referee who refereed La Liga matches from 2008 until 2023. He is also a former international referee with experience in several editions of the FIFA World Cup. He is known for his talkative and "quirky" approach to refereeing: The Guardian has described him as the football star "who doesn't actually play but doesn't half perform".

== Early and personal life ==
Antonio Miguel Mateu Lahoz was born on 12 March 1977 in Algímia d'Alfara, a village in Valencia Province on Spain's eastern coast. He has a large family, with two brothers and three sisters. His elder brother, mother and late father influenced his decision to take up refereeing; in part, the family's need for money after his father died young prompted him to move into refereeing full-time rather than becoming a footballer. Mateu Lahoz played at under-19 level for Valencia in the División de Honor Juvenil, mostly as the back-up for future professional player Luis Rubiales; after his playing career Rubiales became president of the Spanish Football Federation (RFEF) in the later years of Mateu Lahoz's refereeing career, and Mateu Lahoz was considered a likely candidate to succeed Rubiales as RFEF president following the Rubiales affair.

Mateu Lahoz also worked as a physical education teacher before becoming a football referee. His elder sister is a teacher, and prior to his retirement he said he could see himself continuing in that career if he left football. He lives in Valencia and has two sons.

While reflecting on the importance of referees, Mateu Lahoz said that refereeing is his happiness and he enjoyed the responsibility, telling UEFA in 2021 that "part of [the] job is trying to help the players and coaches. If you can do this and be relaxed, then you'll relax them, you can communicate together, and making decisions can be much easier."

== Career ==
=== Spain ===
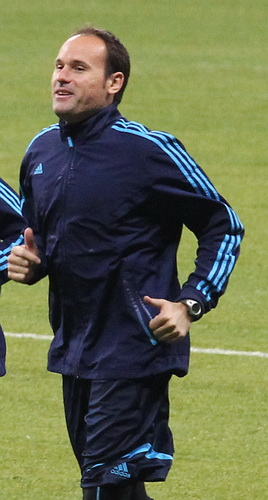
Mateu Lahoz in 2010

In 2008, Mateu Lahoz began working as a referee in La Liga, becoming established as one of the most prominent referees in Spain during his career. Considered unpopular among Spanish football fans, Mateu Lahoz is known for his personal flair; it was reported that he would allow matches to descend into chaos by not reacting to play, and then draw more attention to himself than the game through bizarre discussions with players and controversial decisions.

In 2012, he refereed in the Supercopa de España. It was around this time that he first became known for a particular style, as it was commented on by then-Real Madrid manager José Mourinho; this response was praise, with Mourinho finding it a pleasant difference that Mateu Lahoz preferred talking to players over immediately disciplining them, and that what he did kept the game moving. Barcelona manager Xavi also said, years later, that he found Mateu Lahoz talking a lot to be positive when he was a player (for Barcelona) around that time; the Barcelona manager of the time, Pep Guardiola, reportedly "wasn't such a fan".

Mateu Lahoz was the referee in 2014 Copa del Rey Final between Real Madrid and main rivals Barcelona. In May 2014, he stood out for booking Barcelona's Lionel Messi for dissent when Messi protested an offside call; shown to be onside, Mateu Lahoz supposedly apologised for the mistake after the game. After a 2018 match in which a number of Mateu Lahoz' reportedly questionable decisions went against Barcelona, player Gerard Piqué had to be physically restrained when approaching him after the match. In 2019, Mateu Lahoz had another notable run-in with Barcelona, showing two red cards in a minute: the first to Ronald Araújo for a reportedly debatable professional foul, the second a straight red to Ousmane Dembélé for supposedly protesting that decision. The severity of the second card was criticised, with some criticising the application of a card at all: Messi noted that Dembélé did not speak Spanish at the time, questioning how he would have been able to dissent.

A clip of Mateu Lahoz went viral on 2 April 2022; he was in charge a La Liga match between RCD Mallorca and Getafe when he gave four yellow cards in a single second. Having let a row break out between the teams, he brought two players from each side over to him before showing his card to each of them in an arc. Not seen in the clip, Mateu Lahoz then ran over to a fifth player to card him. More controversially, Mateu Lahoz awarded a penalty to Getafe for handball, and sent off the Mallorca defender, Franco Russo. The most notable point of the match was Mateu Lahoz approaching Getafe striker Enes Ünal in the tunnel at half-time to say Ünal "owed him one"; having shown Ünal a yellow card in the first half, spectators were surprised when Mateu Lahoz did not send off Ünal after he then elbowed Russo. Ünal and Russo were two of the four shown yellows at once. Mallorca filed formal complaints with both La Liga and the RFEF regarding Mateu Lahoz' decisions. In response, the arbitration committee sat him out for two matchdays, reported to be for what he said to Ünal.

On 31 December 2022, Mateu Lahoz refereed the end-of-year Catalan derby between Barcelona and local rivals Espanyol. Mateu Lahoz was already subject to criticism at the time, following a high-profile FIFA World Cup match in which he handed out many cards. Partway through the first half, he stopped play and sprinted across the pitch to talk to and kiss Barcelona manager Xavi. Mateu Lahoz gave 15 yellow cards, including 2 to the Barcelona bench, and 4 reds, one overturned by VAR (also reported as 16 yellows and 3 reds with one overturned), during the match, which became particularly chaotic towards the end. The match ended in a draw; Xavi told the press after the match that he did not blame Mateu Lahoz for the result, but had told him at the end of the match that he had lost control (for which Mateu Lahoz gave Xavi a yellow card). The Athletic wrote that while Mateu Lahoz did not get any major calls wrong during the match, "there is a feeling among players and coaches that when a situation gets heated and players start to lose their heads, he is unable to calm things down." It also questioned whether it was appropriate for the RFEF to have assigned Mateu Lahoz to the match, considering both his history (with Barcelona and then-recently in Qatar) and pre-existing tensions between the clubs meaning it would likely be very heated.

Mateu Lahoz then refereed a Copa del Rey match between Sevilla and Linares Deportivo on 5 January 2023, showing a red card to Sevilla's manager after 17 minutes, the only card shown in this match. The RFEF did not assign him to another match in any capacity for two weeks, with the arbitration committee saying his absence was not a punishment. It was during this break that he made plans to retire at the end of the season. He was given his next refereeing appointment on 19 January, though CCMA suggested that he was brought back in because two other officials, who had made a particularly notable error, were being sat out.

He retired from La Liga on 4 June 2023 after 288 matches, being received with a guard of honour and standing ovation at his last match.

=== International ===
From 2011 to 2023, he was also a FIFA listed international referee. He worked as a referee in the 2014 FIFA World Cup qualifiers; at the 2016 Summer Olympics in Brazil; the 2018 FIFA World Cup in Russia (and its qualifiers); the UEFA Euro 2020; and the 2022 FIFA World Cup in Qatar.

He refereed a 2018 Champions League quarter-final match between Manchester City and Liverpool, during which Pep Guardiola, Manchester City's Spanish manager, notably addressed him on the pitch when half-time came. Guardiola was then sent off in the second half, for speaking to Mateu Lahoz after he controversially disallowed a City goal; Guardiola responded that he had been polite and so getting sent off was too much, also saying that "Mateu Lahoz is a special guy, he likes to be different, he likes to be special. He's a referee who likes to feel different, he's special." The Offside Rule wrote that Mateu Lahoz allowed incidents between players to flare up by not paying attention to the game, and described the disallowed goal in this match as "a catastrophic error". On 29 May 2021, Mateu Lahoz refereed the 2021 Champions League final between Manchester City and Chelsea. A more natural game, he still produced a much-discussed moment when he helped Antonio Rüdiger, on the ground injured, to stand up, then immediately showed him a yellow card.

On 25 November 2022, Mateu Lahoz refereed Qatar's second match of their home World Cup, which left them in a position to be the worst-performing host of a World Cup; Football365 said he was "the single bravest referee at the tournament" for his decision to not even consider awarding Qatar a penalty after an incident in the box. On 9 December 2022, Mateu Lahoz was the referee in the "Battle of Lusail", the quarter-final match between the Netherlands and Argentina; he issued a record 18 yellow cards (to 15 players, including two to Denzel Dumfries that saw him sent off after both the match and penalty shoot-out had concluded, and to Argentina's manager and assistant manager). The number of cards, as well as their use, was criticised: some were deemed too harsh and some too lenient, with other incidents in the match (which at one point broke into an on-pitch brawl involving the entire Dutch substitutes' bench) getting completely overlooked. BBC Sport's Emma Smith wrote in her match report that he "did not help matters, to be kind. To be unkind, he had an absolute shocker - brandishing his yellow card with abandon ratcheted up tensions considerably, and by the time he finally showed red to Dumfries, he had long since lost all control." Smith also noted various players' unimpressed reactions to the referee. Argentina would go on to win this World Cup, while CBS Sports reported that Mateu Lahoz had been sent home after the match.

== Response ==
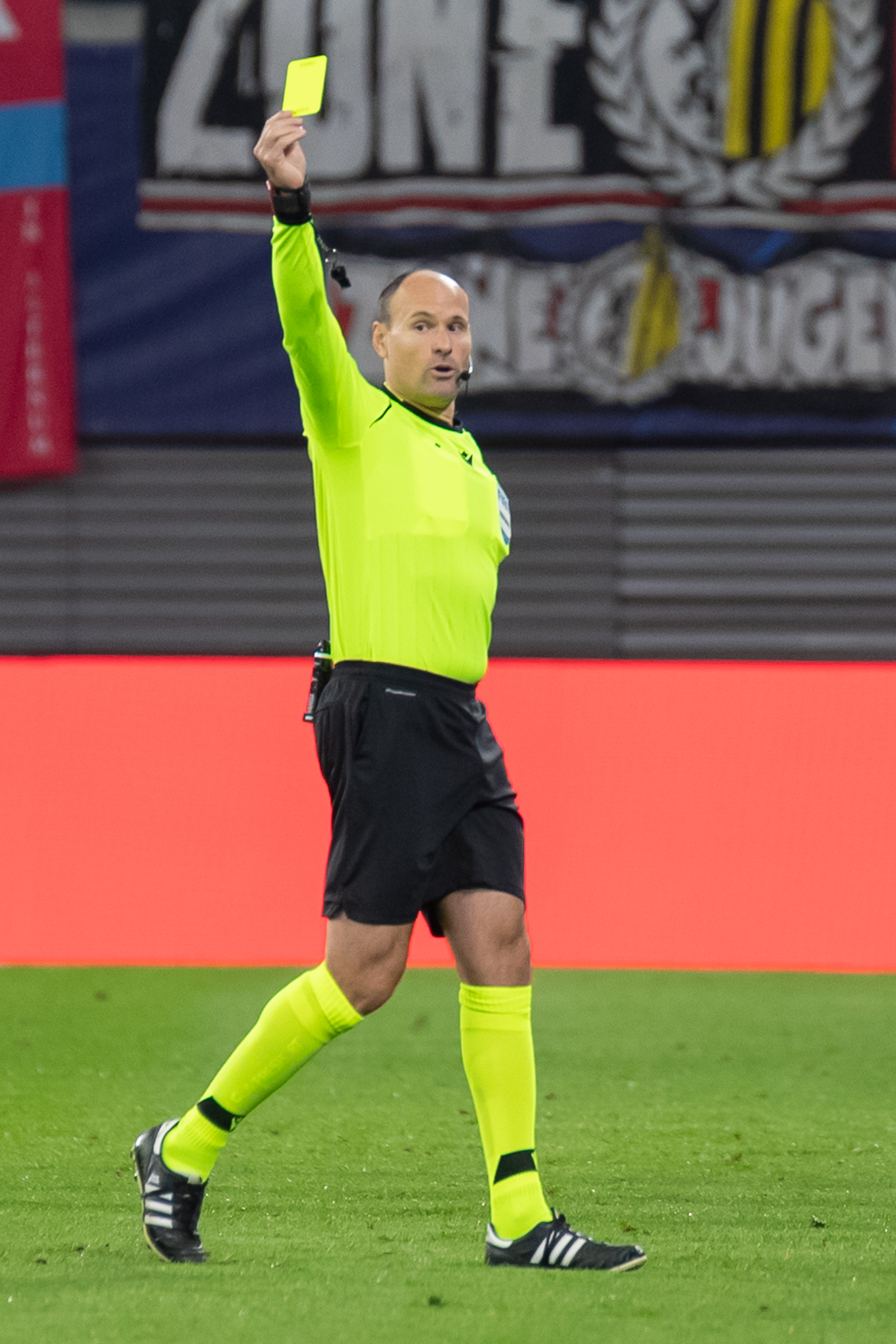
Mateu Lahoz brandishing a yellow card in a 2019 Champions League game

Mateu Lahoz distinguished himself from his peers in refereeing, though his quirks in arbitration have changed over time. Initially noted for being particularly talkative, which some saw as preferable to being strict and others found too lenient and distracting, his particular style reportedly became more erratic: at points he chose to converse with players at large, while at others he would directly give cards for minor infractions, including to people asking him about other cards. English journalist of Spanish football Sid Lowe coined the term "mateulahozing" as a verb to describe refereeing that draws attention to itself. The manner in which Mateu Lahoz showed players cards, "striding over and thrusting yellow cards in their faces", is said to be one source of his notoriety. Mateu Lahoz has been compared to English referee Mike Dean, also known for "producing multiple bizarre moments on the pitch."

In Spain, Mateu Lahoz was widely negatively speculated to be a fan of Real Madrid, due to his decisions in matches featuring them or their rivals often benefitting Real Madrid; fans of the club argue that, while his decisions against other teams sometimes helped Real Madrid, he also made controversial calls that did not help them, and was an inconsistent referee in general. Discussions of Mateu Lahoz' calls often involve the rivalry between Real Madrid and Barcelona, further contributed to by Barcelona figures feeling he lacked match control and Real Madrid manager Carlo Ancelotti instead favouring him, saying that "Mateu Lahoz is the best referee in Spain and in Europe". Though considered unpopular among fans, there are also people who enjoyed his refereeing for its entertainment value; Lowe has pointed to this as a reason why comical hatred of Mateu Lahoz is unfair. Lowe argued that while Mateu Lahoz was attention-seeking, Spanish fans and media were happy to give him that attention.

He became an international "pantomime villain" of football in December 2022 – in this month he refereed just two matches, both particularly high-profile, while handing out over 35 cards. From these games, he has the records for handing out the most cards in a World Cup match and the most cards in a La Liga match. (Note: Reports on the matches differ in total card count, both due to the number and timing of cards making it confusing even on the referee's report, and with some sources counting two yellows converted to reds and others not. Counting cards physically shown and not discounted, Mateu Lahoz showed 19 in each of these matches, for a total of 38.) Barcelona's Dutch midfielder Frenkie de Jong, who "somehow survived" playing both of these matches without receiving a card, said it was "chaos [...] I don't know what happened exactly". After the first of the matches, the 2022 World Cup quarter-final between the Netherlands and Argentina, Spanish fans were reportedly grateful for Mateu Lahoz' performance; notorious in Spain and somewhat recognised for his previous international exploits, these fans felt the prominent match revealed the lack of quality in Spanish refereeing in general and "everyone else finally knew what they [Spanish teams] were up against".

== Major matches refereed ==
Date	Match	Tournament	Venue	Result	Ref
29 May 2021	Manchester City vs. Chelsea	2021 UEFA Champions League final	Estádio do Dragão, Porto	0–1	

== See also ==
- List of football referees
