= Sarrión =

Sarrión, Spain
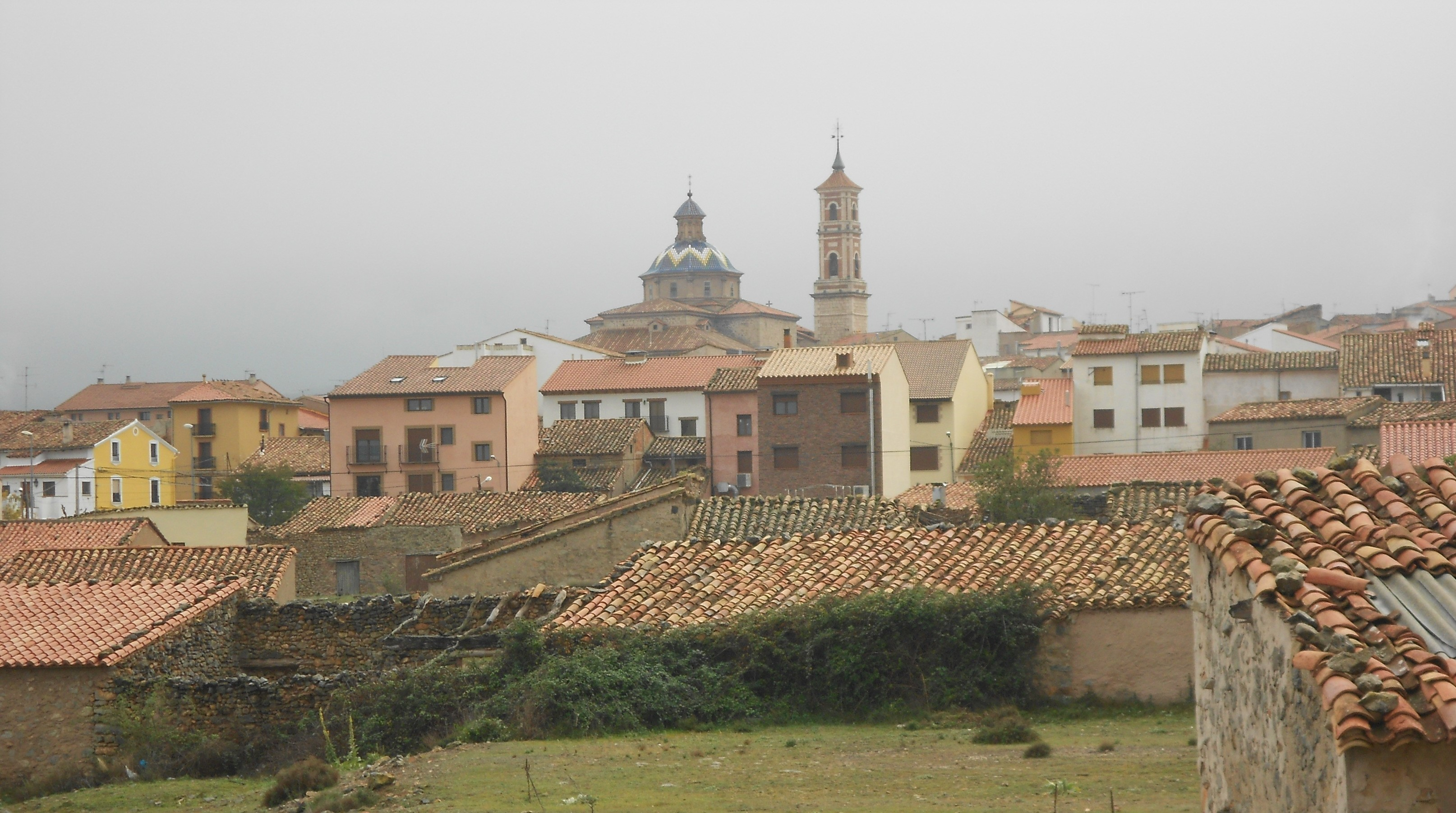

- Coat of arms

- Location within Spain
- Coordinates: 40°08′N 0°49′W
- Country: Spain
- Autonomous community: Aragon
- Province: Teruel
- Municipality: Sarrión

Area
  - Total: 140.44 km^{2} (54.22 sq mi)
- Elevation: 991 m (3,251 ft)

Population (2025-01-01)
  - Total: 1,261
  - Density: 8.979/km^{2} (23.26/sq mi)
- Time zone: UTC+1 (CET)
  - Summer (DST): UTC+2 (CEST)

Sarrión is a municipality located in the province of Teruel, Aragon, Spain. According to the 2004 census (INE), the municipality had a population of 1,049 inhabitants.

== See also ==
- List of municipalities in Teruel
