= Santa Eulalia del Campo =

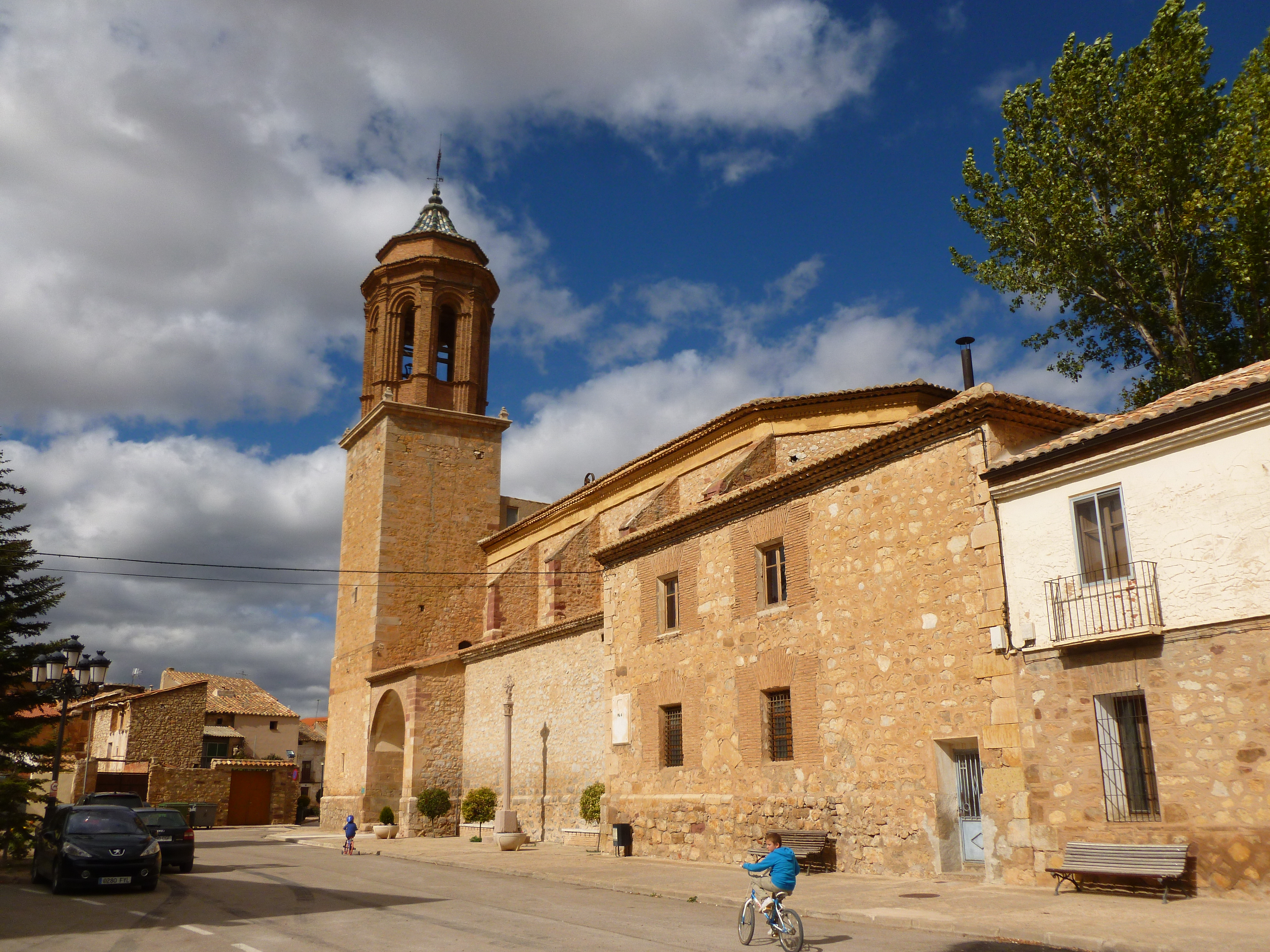

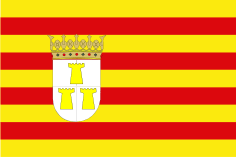
- Flag Coat of arms

- Location of Santa Eulalia del Campo Santa Eulalia del Campo (Spain)
- Coordinates: 40°34′N 1°19′W
- Country: Spain
- Autonomous community: Aragon
- Province: Teruel
- Municipality: Santa Eulalia del Campo

Government
  - Mayor: Héctor Palatsi Martínez

Area
  - Total: 80.9 km^{2} (31.2 sq mi)
- Elevation: 984 m (3,228 ft)

Population (2025-01-01)
  - Total: 1,004
- Time zone: UTC+1 (CET)
  - Summer (DST): UTC+2 (CEST)

Santa Eulalia del Campo is a municipality located in the province of Teruel, Aragon, Spain. According to the 2005 census (INE), the municipality has a population of 1,171 inhabitants.

This town is located near Sierra Palomera, a mountain range of the Sistema Ibérico. On January 12, 2021, a minimum temperature of −23.0 °C (−9.4 °F) was registered.

== Tourism ==
The surroundings of the Chapel of the Mill; Sierra Palomera with a view of the former premises of the Sugar Factory; Jiloca; the Media Caseta Mount or Mount Cirogrillos; Railway Station Via Minero Peirón of the Virgen del Pilar - on the road to the Tremedal Orihuela - are some of the tourist attractions.

== See also ==
- El Cañizar lake
- List of municipalities in Teruel
