= Sierra Menera =

Mountain range in Spain

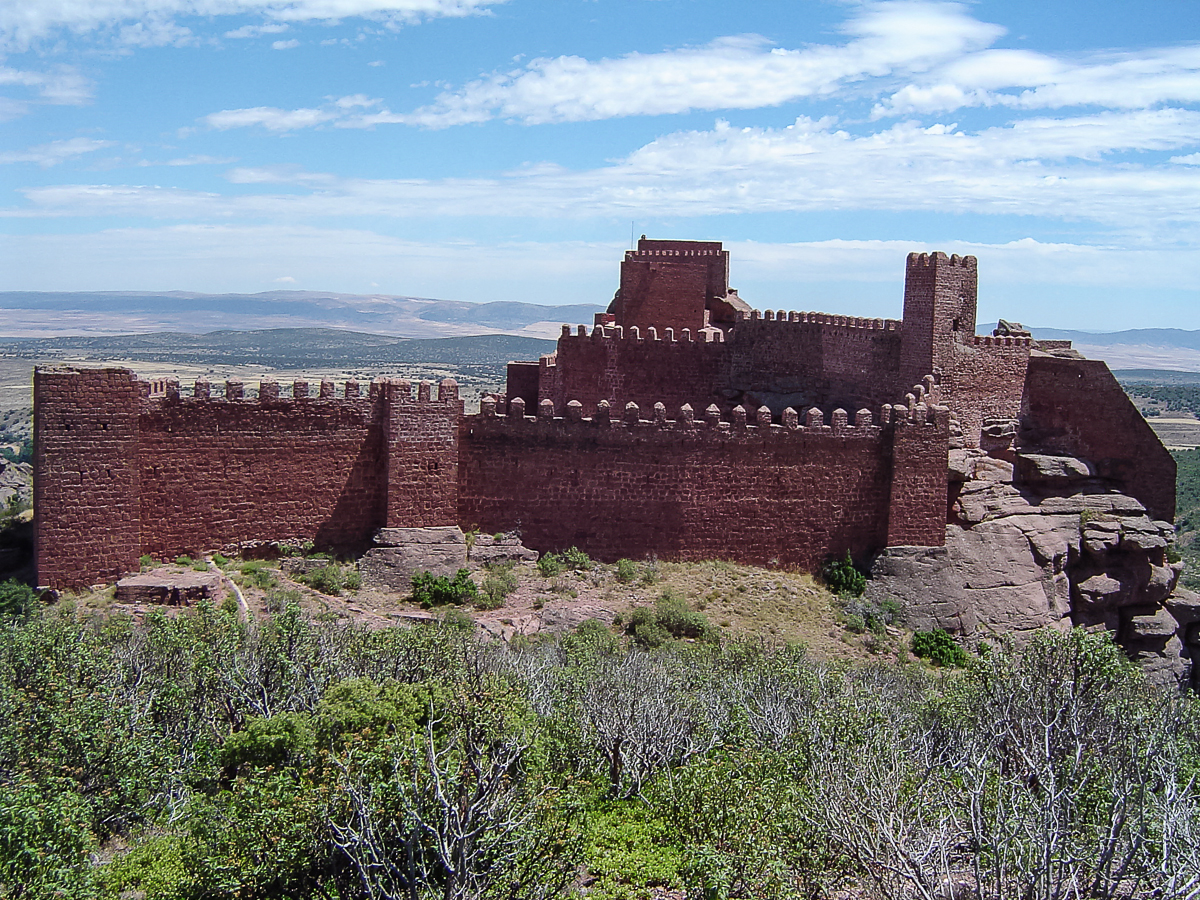
- The Castle of Peracense built on a ridge in Sierra Menera

Highest point
- Peak: Monte de San Ginés
- Elevation: 1,601 m (5,253 ft)
- Coordinates: 40°41′30″N 1°32′33″W

Dimensions
- Length: 29 km (18 mi) NNW/SSE
- Width: 5.3 km (3.3 mi) ENE/WSW

Geography
- Location within Spain
- Location: Jiloca, Comunidad de Teruel, Sierra de Albarracín, Aragon; Guadalajara, Castile-La Mancha
- Parent range: Iberian System, SW zone

Geology
- Rock age(s): Ordovician & Silurian
- Rock type(s): Conglomerate, clay

Climbing
- Easiest route: From the towns of Ojos Negros or Villar del Salz

Sierra Menera is a 31 km (19 mi) long mountain range in the southwestern end of the Iberian System.

Administratively the Sierra Menera belongs to the Sierra de Albarracín, Jiloca and Comunidad de Teruel, comarcas of Aragon, as well as to the Province of Guadalajara, Castile-La Mancha in its western side.

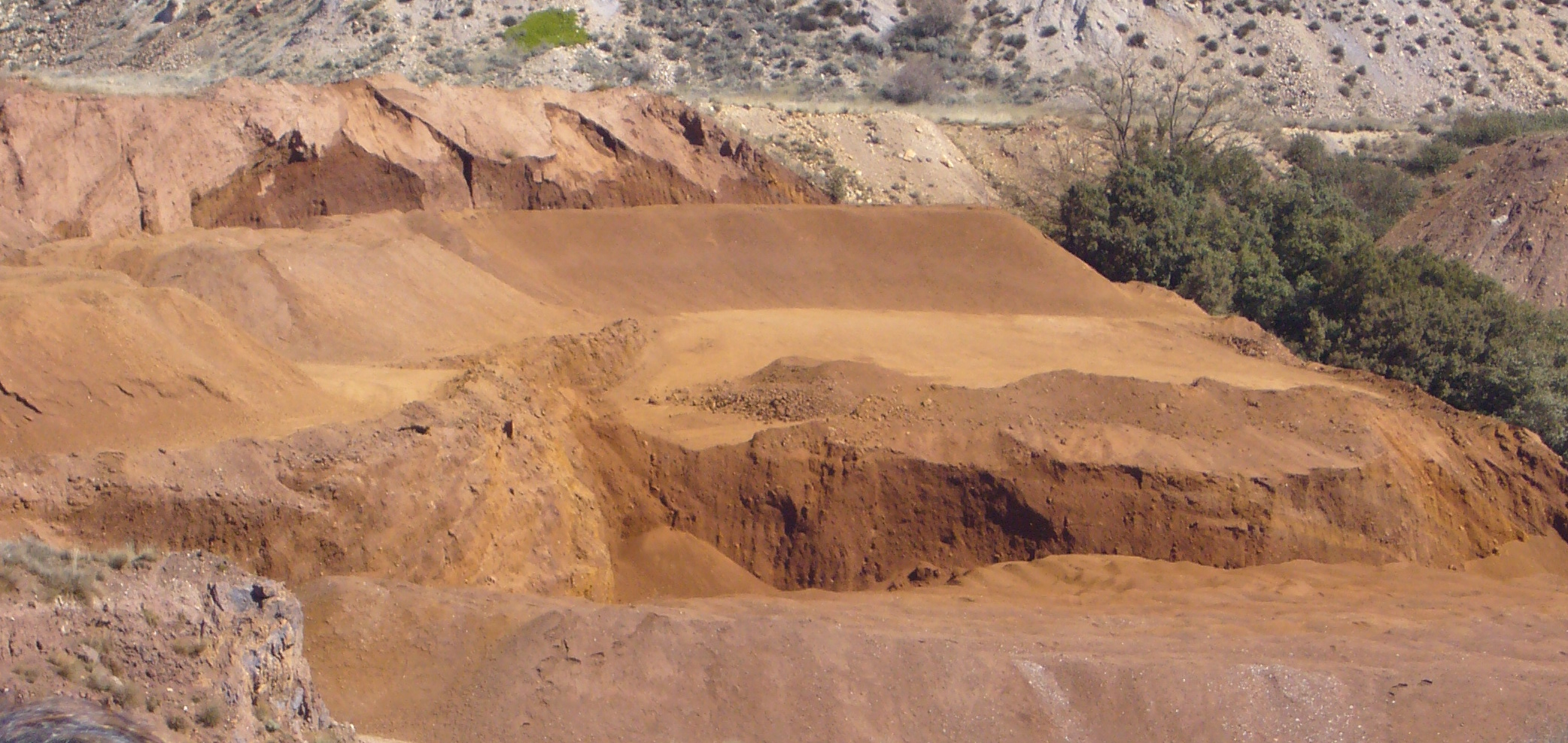
Open-pit mining of iron ore in Sierra Menera

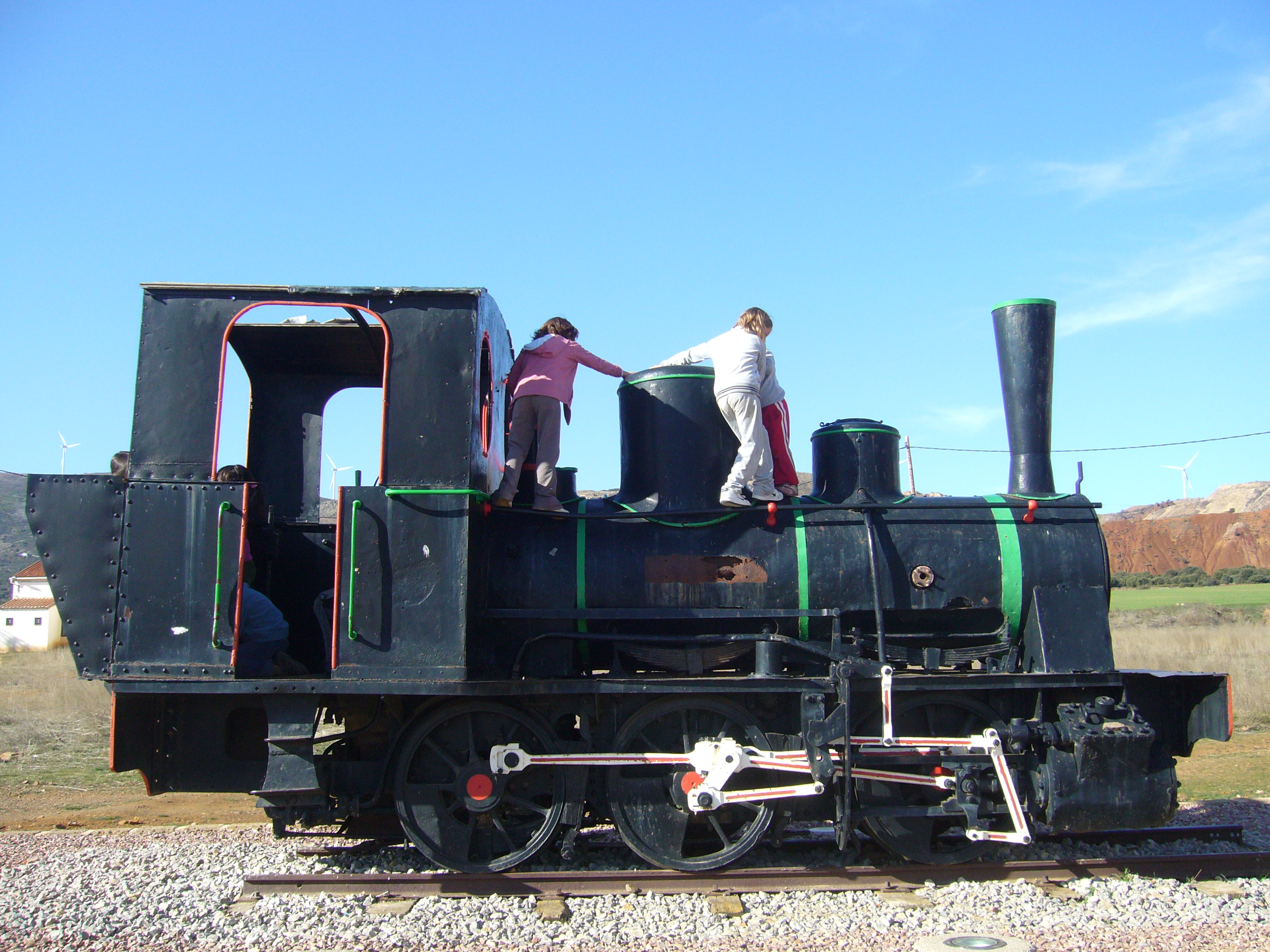
Sierra Menera mining company railway engine in Ojos Negros

The Castle of Peracense rises atop an escarpment in the southern part of the range. The place known as Mirador de la Marajosa offers ample views of the surrounding landscape. There are aerogenerators on some of the Sierra Menera's ridges.

== Geography ==
The main range is aligned in a NNW - SSE direction. It is not as high or conspicuous as other mountain ranges of the Iberian System. From the hydrographic point of view the Sierra Menera divides the Atlantic from the Mediterranean watershed. The eastern rivulets are tributaries of the Jiloca River, the western of the Tagus, and the northern have no exit, ending up in the Laguna de Gallocanta basin.

Sierra Menera's highest point is the 1,601 m high summit known as Monte de San Ginés; another important peak is the 1591 m high Mojón Alto.

== History ==
The Sierra Menera's name derives from the word for ore in Spanish language, for it has rich iron ore deposits that were exploited since ancient Celtiberian, and later also during Roman times, well until the late 20th century.The mines are located between the provinces of Teruel (Aragon) and Guadalajara (Castile). This led to many disputes in the 16th century. From the late 19th century onward, they were exploited through open-pit operations by Compañía Minera de Sierra Menera S. A.. The extracted mineral consisted of iron oxides, especially limonite, formed by the alteration of carbonates.

The disagreement over the cost of transporting ore using the already existing railway line owned by the Compañía del Ferrocarril Central de Aragón led to the construction of their own railway. This line was meter-gauge and ended at a loading pier in Sagunto (Valencia). The new railway had a length of 204 km and entered service in 1907. This was the longest private company-owned railway line in Europe. The construction cost was very high, as major engineering works were required, such as the viaduct over the Albentosa River, which is 180 meters long and 50 meters at its maximum height. This bridge is still preserved today as part of Vía Verde de Ojos Negros, a rail trail. In 1972, its railway ceased operations, and the transport of the ore was transferred to the RENFE railway. The mines were abandoned in 1985.

A blast furnace facility also belonging to the company was also located in Sagunto, where a pelletizing plant and a long jetty were built in the 1970s. The Sagunto ore-processing facilities, Altos Hornos del Mediterráneo S.A., ceased their activity in 1984 and the Sierra Menera mining company went bankrupt in 1987, following which the mines and their subsidiary facilities were closed. Massive unemployment hit the mining town of Ojos Negros after mining activity in the nearby mountains ceased. As a consequence its population went from 3000 in the 20th century to 560 in 2010.

The Sierra Menera range has been much scarred by environmentally unsound mining practices across the centuries. There are many tons of untreated debris and slag scattered across the range, contaminating the soil and the groundwater. Since mid 20th century, large-scale open-pit mining compounded matters, causing severe land degradation in vast mountain areas.

At the time of the closure of the mines there was no official regulation forcing the mining company to repair the environmental damage caused by its activity. The Spanish Mining Law relevant at the time didn't include a provision regarding environmental impact of mining activity when it was promulgated in 1973.

== See also ==
- Mountains of Aragon
- Ojos Negros
