= Ojos Negros, Teruel =

Ojos Negros
- municipality
- Flag Coat of arms

- Location within Spain
- Coordinates: 40°44′N 1°30′W
- Country: Spain
- Autonomous community: Aragon
- Province: Teruel
- Comarca: Jiloca

Area
  - Total: 90 km^{2} (35 sq mi)
- Elevation: 1,151 m (3,776 ft)

Population (2025-01-01)
  - Total: 321
  - Density: 3.6/km^{2} (9.2/sq mi)
- Time zone: UTC+1 (CET)
  - Summer (DST): UTC+2 (CEST)

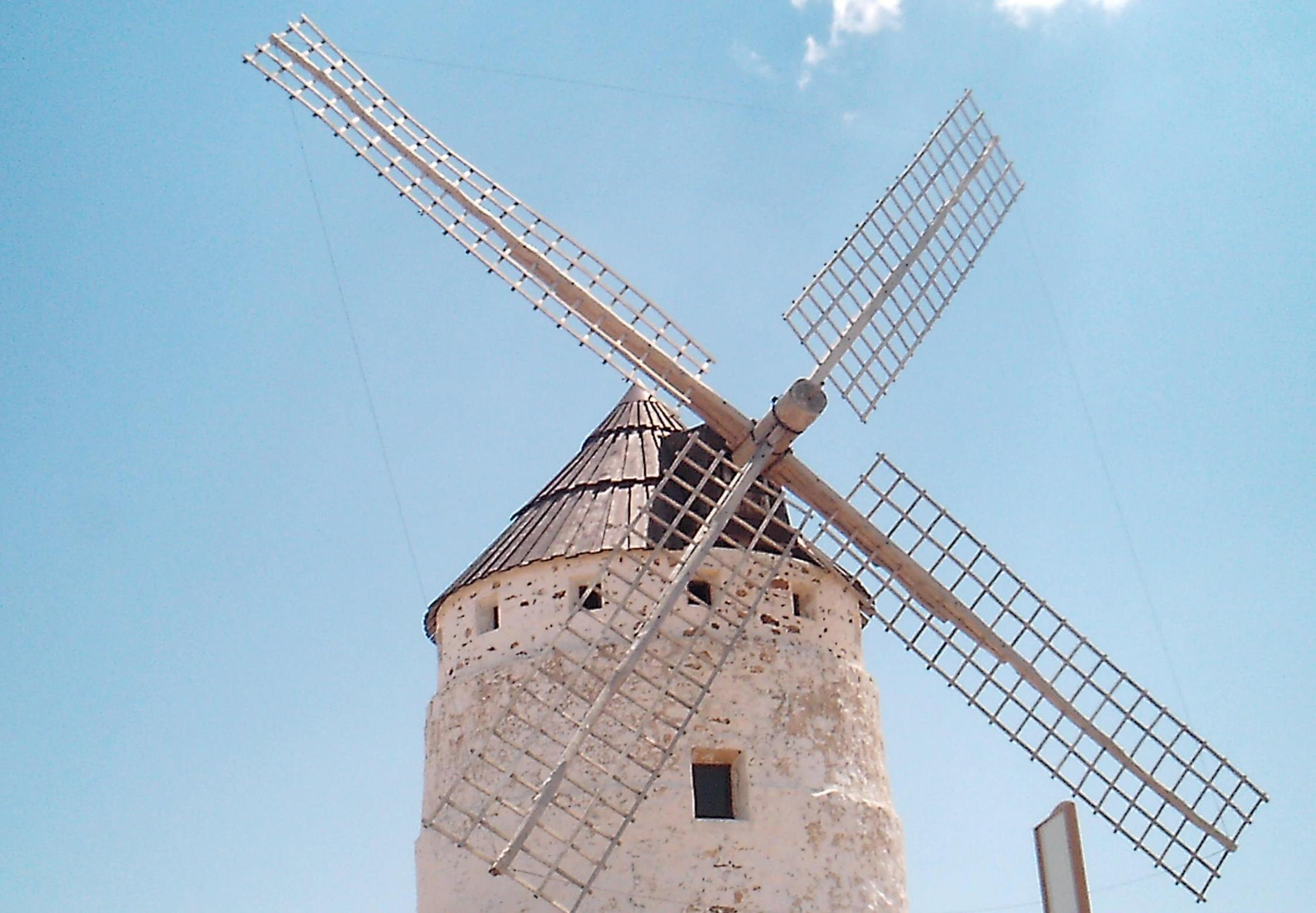
A windmill in Ojos Negros

Ojos Negros is a municipality located in the province of Teruel, Aragon, Spain. According to the 2004 census (INE), the municipality has a population of 531 inhabitants.

It is a mining town located close to Sierra Menera, a range much scarred by open-pit mining, part of the mountainous Iberian System area.

Unemployment hit Ojos Negros hard when mining activity in the nearby mountains ceased. Its population went from 3000 in the 20th century to 560 in 2010. During the Sierra Menera company mining times, between 1900 and 1987, most of the population lived in the Barrio Minero town closer to the mines. Now only about 40 people live there.

The town is located at the start of the Ojos Negros Greenway, which follows the route of the original mining railway to the town of Puerto de Sagunto in the Valencian Community.

== See also ==
- Sierra Menera
- List of municipalities in Teruel
