= Barracas, Spain =

Town in Castellón, Spain

Coordinates: 40.017°N 0.683°W

Coat of arms of Barracas.

Barracas is a Spanish town located in Castellón.

In 2004 a truck carrying 25 tonnes of ammonium nitrate fertilizer exploded half an hour after a traffic accident on March 9, 2004, killing two people and injuring five others. The explosion, which could be heard at a distance of several kilometers, caused a crater 5 metres (16 ft) deep.

== See also ==
- List of municipalities in Castellón
