= Algímia d'Alfara =

- Municipality
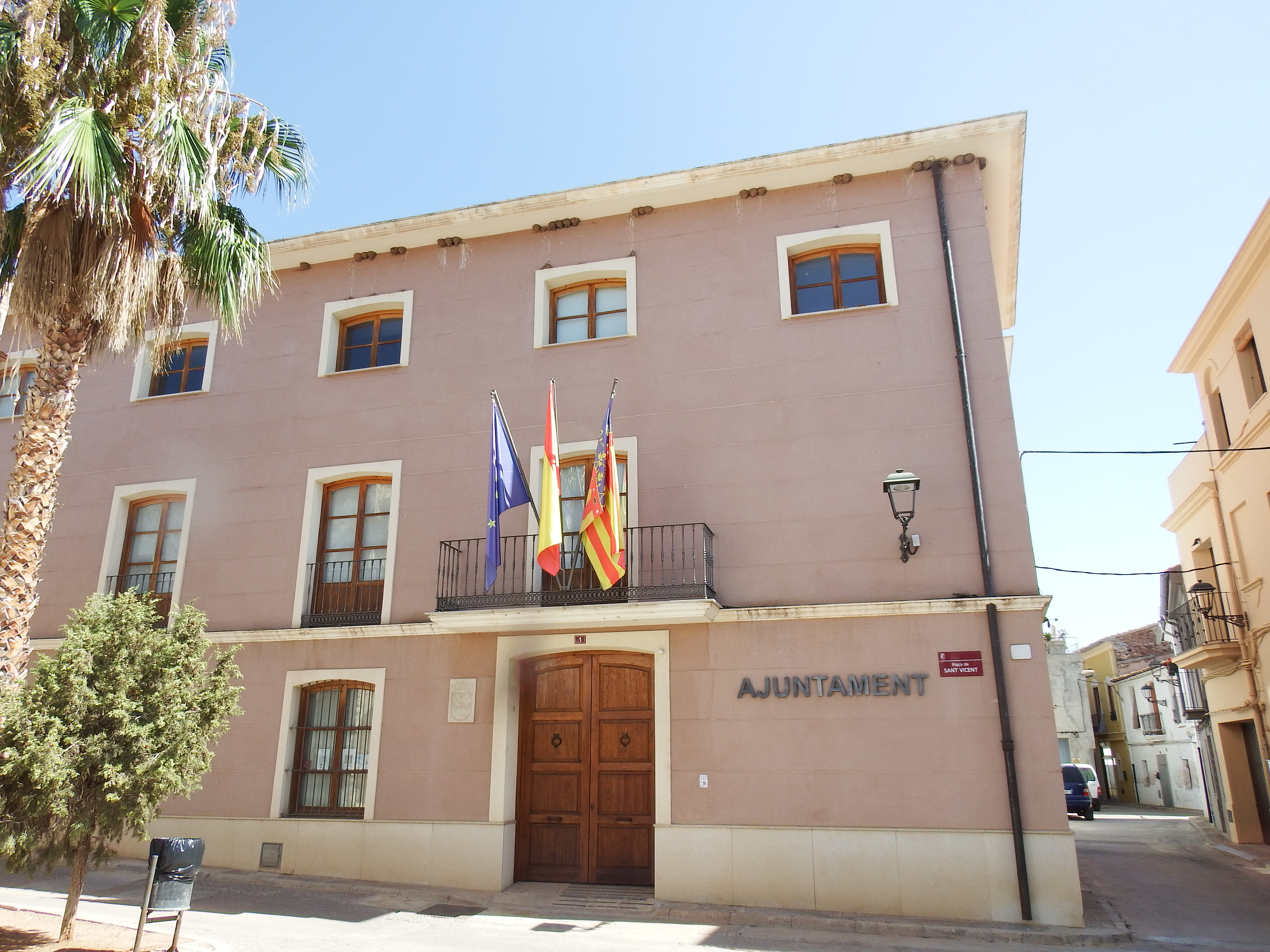
- Town hall

- Coat of arms

- Location in Spain Algímia d'Alfara (Valencian Community) Algímia d'Alfara (Spain)
- Coordinates: 39°45′11″N 0°21′42″W
- Country: Spain
- Autonomous community: Valencia
- Province: Valencia
- Comarca: Camp de Morvedre

Government
  - Alcalde: Francisco Salt Mocholí

Area
  - Total: 14.40 km^{2} (5.56 sq mi)
- Elevation: 183 m (600 ft)

Population (2025-01-01)
  - Total: 1,115
  - Density: 77.43/km^{2} (200.5/sq mi)
- Demonyms: Algimià, algimiana
- Time zone: UTC+1 (CET)
  - Summer (DST): UTC+2 (CEST)
- Postal code: 46148
- Official language: Valencian
- Website: Official website

Algímia d'Alfara is a municipality in the comarca of Camp de Morvedre in Valencia, Spain.

== Notable people ==
- Antonio Mateu Lahoz, professional football referee was born in this village.

== See also ==
- List of municipalities in Valencia
