= Ebrón =

River in Spain

Coordinates: 40.0953°N 1.2525°W

Ebrón River
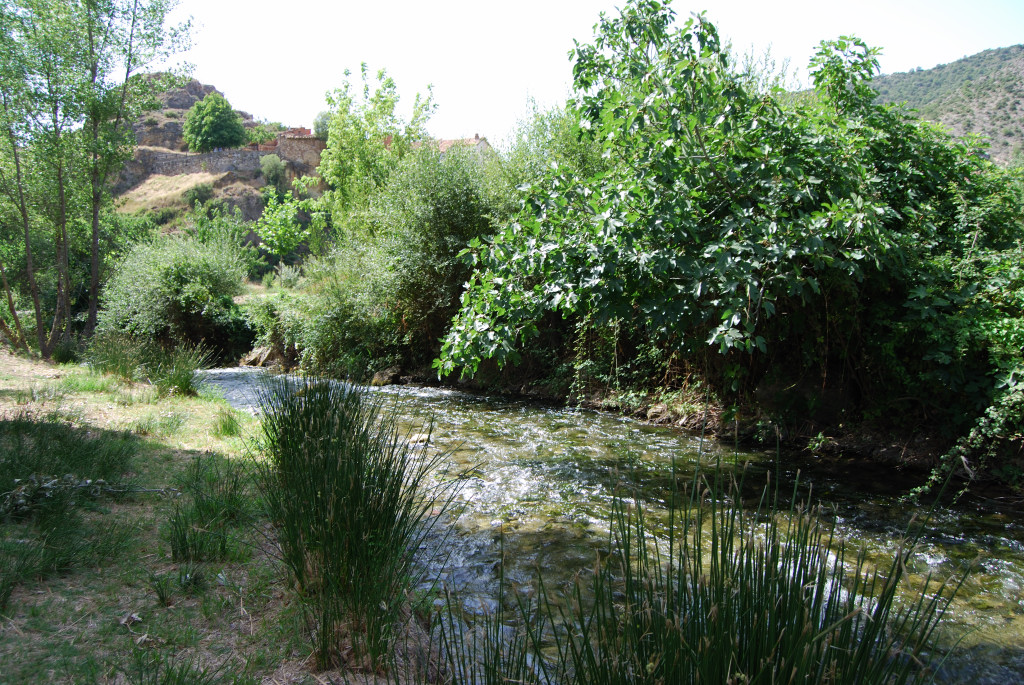
- View of the Ebrón River

Location
- Country: Spain
- Region: Aragon; Valencian Community
- District: Province of Teruel; Province of Valencia

Physical characteristics
- Source
  - location: Tormón
- Mouth
  - location: Turia River

The Ebrón River is a river of Spain, a tributary of the Turia River. It sources near Tormón, in the province of Teruel (Aragon). It appears in the comarca of the Rincón de Ademuz, province of Valencia (Valencian Community). It crosses the municipalities of Castielfabib and Torrebaja, and it mouths in the Turia River, near the limits of the municipality of Ademuz. The Ebrón River, with the Bohílges River, is the main tributary of the Turia River in the comarca of the Rincón de Ademuz.
