= Ademuz =

- Municipality
- Ademuz
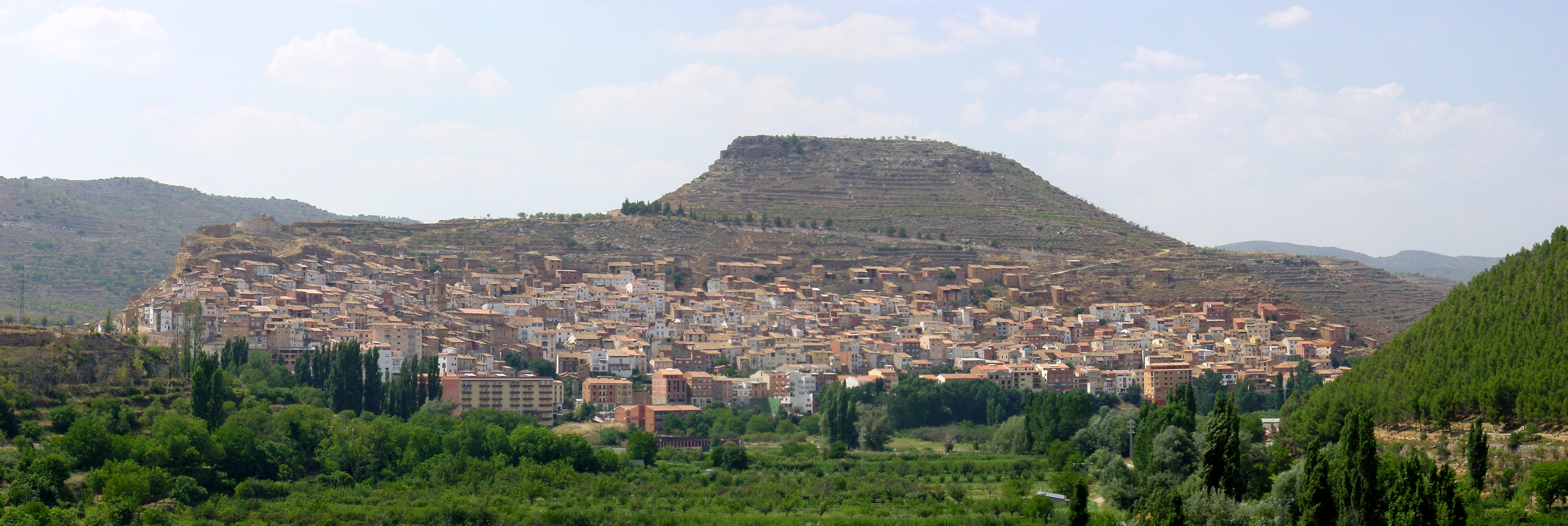
- Panoramic view

- Coat of arms

- Location in Spain Ademuz (Spain)
- Coordinates: 40°4′N 1°17′W
- Country: Spain
- Autonomous community: Valencian Community
- Province: Valencia
- Comarca: Rincón de Ademuz (Racó d'Ademús)
- Judicial district: Liria

Government
  - Alcalde: Fernando Soriano Antón (2007) (PSPV-PSOE)

Area
  - Total: 100.42 km^{2} (38.77 sq mi)
- Elevation: 660 m (2,170 ft)

Population (2025-01-01)
  - Total: 1,015
  - Density: 10.11/km^{2} (26.18/sq mi)
- Demonym: Ademucero/-a
- Time zone: UTC+1 (CET)
  - Summer (DST): UTC+2 (CEST)
- Postal code: 46140
- Official language(s): Spanish
- Website: Official website

Ademuz is a municipality in the comarca of Rincón de Ademuz in the Valencian Community, Spain. The name in Valencian is Ademús, but the local language is Spanish, not Valencian.

== History ==
The many archaeological remains still present from different time periods—Neolithic, Iberian, Roman—reveal an early occupation of the area. Notwithstanding, the first written references are Arabic ones, focusing on its castle, whose advantageous emplacement dominated the Turia river and its natural passage from the lands of Aragon to the city of Valencia.

The Muslim fortress of Al-Dāmūs was conquered by Peter II of Aragon in 1210, with the aid of the hospitalier and templar knights, who were rewarded with the right to collect some taxes from the area. It fell back into Muslim hands shortly thereafter. It was finally incorporated into the kingdom of Valencia by James I of Aragon, who put it under direct control of the crown, together with the other historical village of the comarca, Castielfabib.

As a royal villa, Ademuz periodically sent an elected representative to the Corts Valencianes. As a frontier fortress, it suffered from the wars with Castile in the 14th century: both Ademuz and Castielfabib were invaded and occupied by Peter I of Castile. The heroic defense and the loyalty of its population were later rewarded by Peter IV of Aragón and his immediate successors, who gave the villa new rights and privileges.

From the beginnings of the 14th century onwards, Ademuz and its countryside were also an Encomienda of the Order of Montesa, which anyway never ruled over Ademuz, limiting itself to collect some taxes they had rights over.

On June 7, 1656, the villa suffered a massive earthquake which destroyed the primitive church of San Pedro Intramuros, the city council and forty other houses; the ramparts and the towers of the castle, which had been built surrounding the top of the mountain were also destroyed. Notwithstanding, Ademuz's castle will still prove its worth during the many civil wars of the 19th century, with it being occupied and (supposedly) rebuilt several times by carlist troops.

The two original municipalities which existed in the Rincón's comarca, Castielfabib and Ademuz, became fragmented over time, affecting specially that of Ademuz, from which several villages seceded as they reached some populational and economical importance: Vallanca (17th century), Puebla de San Miguel (18th century), Casas Altas y Casas Bajas (both during the 19th century).

== Geography ==
Ademuz is situated in the middle of the Rincón de Ademuz, a Spanish comarca belonging to Valencian Community representing an exclave situated between the territories of the provinces of Cuenca (Castile-La Mancha) and Teruel (Aragon). The town counts three pedanías (civil parishes): Mas del Olmo, Segsa and Val de la Sabina.

== Demography ==
As of the 2008 census of INE, the population of Ademuz was 1,269.

== Gallery ==
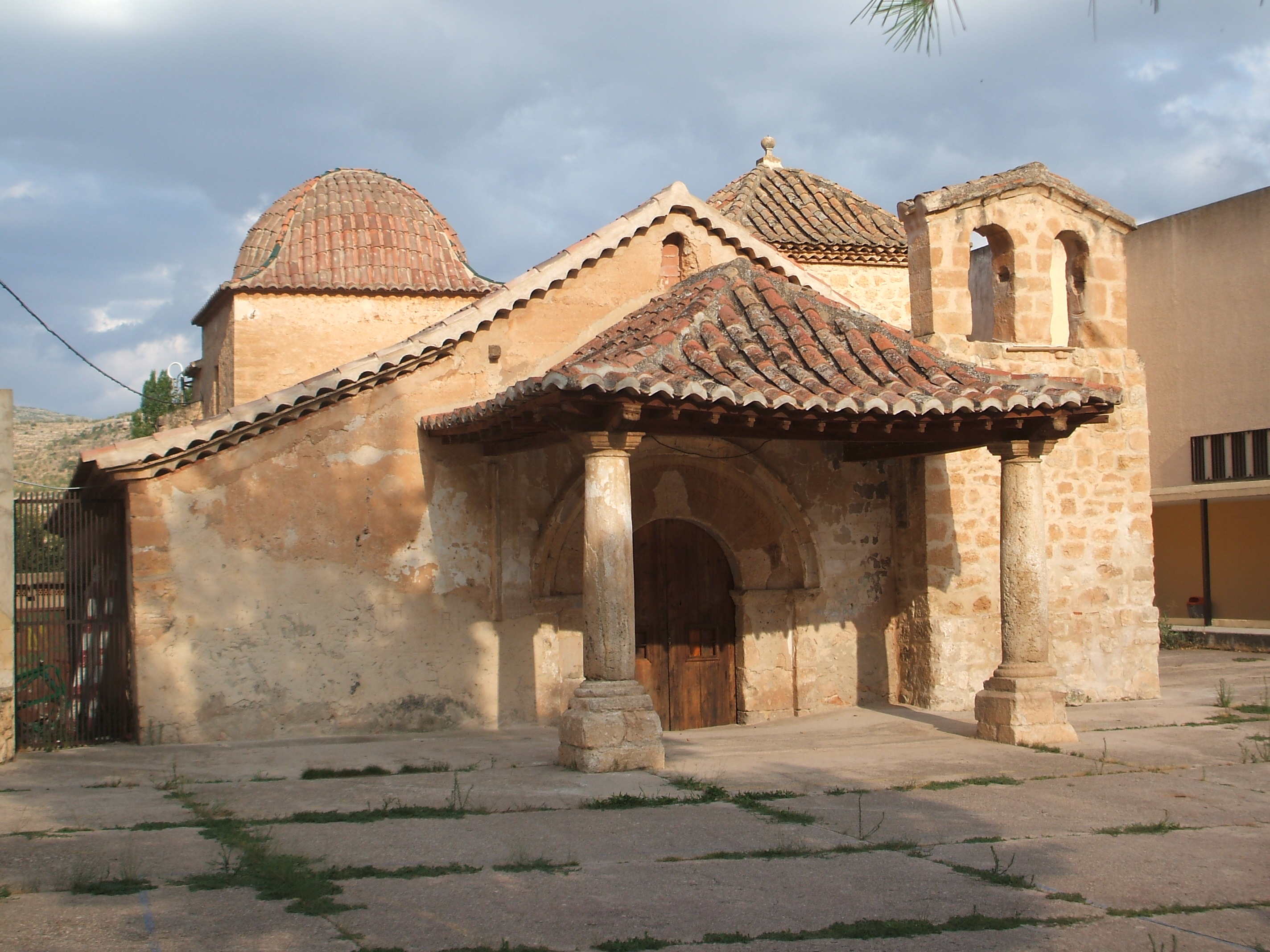
Church of Nuestra Señora de la Huerta, 14th century

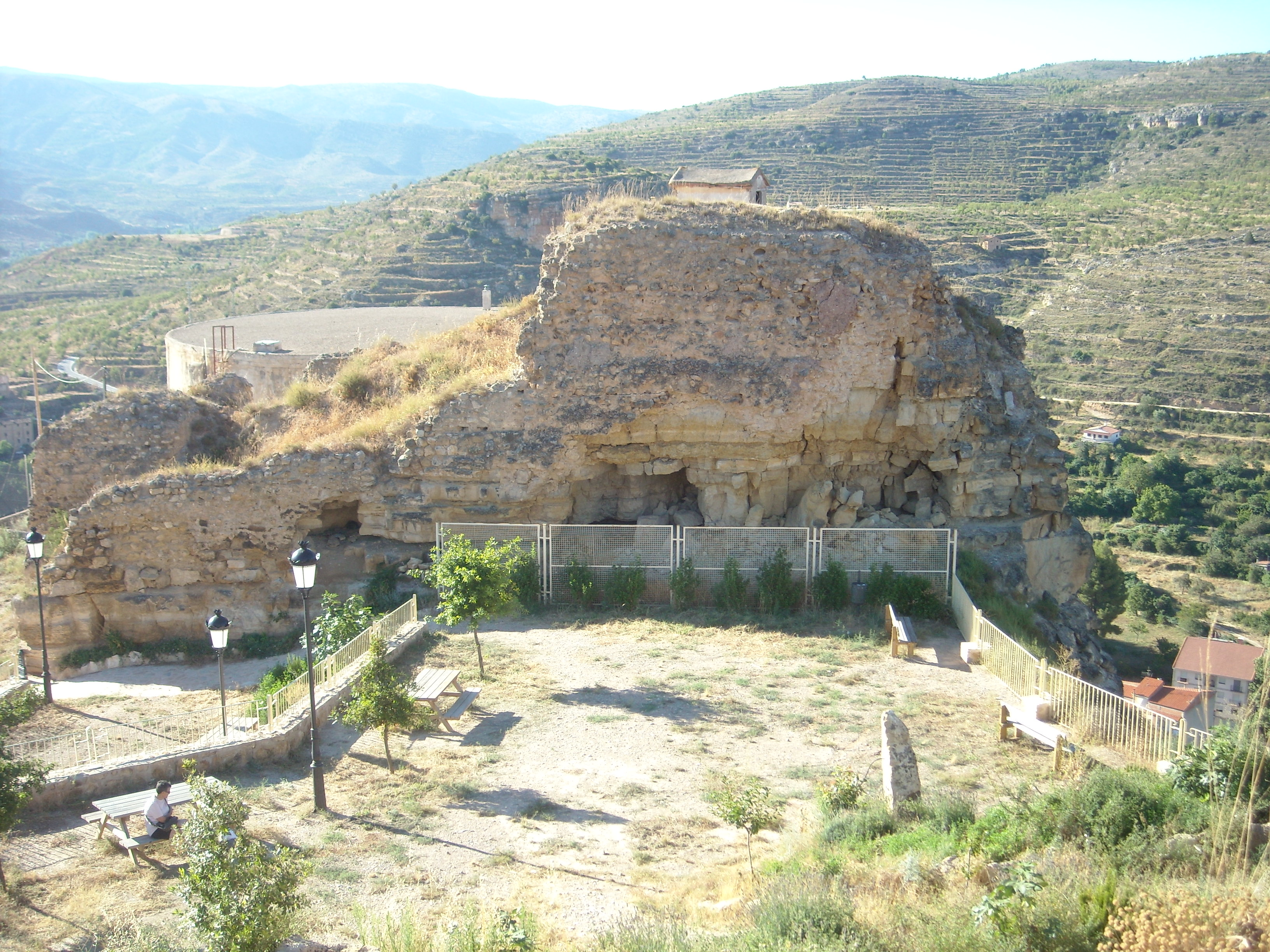
Ademuz castle

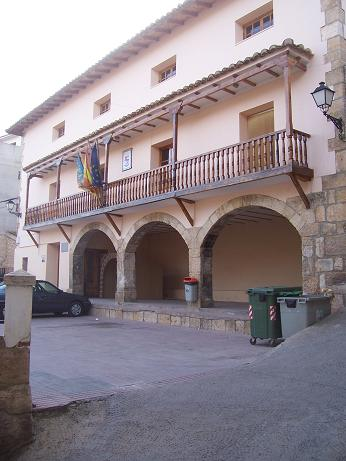
Town hall

== See also ==
- List of municipalities in Valencia

== Literature ==
- Candel Tortajada, F.: Viaje al Rincón de Ademuz. Barcelona, 1977. ISBN 84-01-44182-X
- Eslava Blasco, R.: Ademuz y su patrimonio histórico-artístico. Ademuz, 2007. ISBN 978-84-606-4251-0
