= Castielfabib =

- Municipality
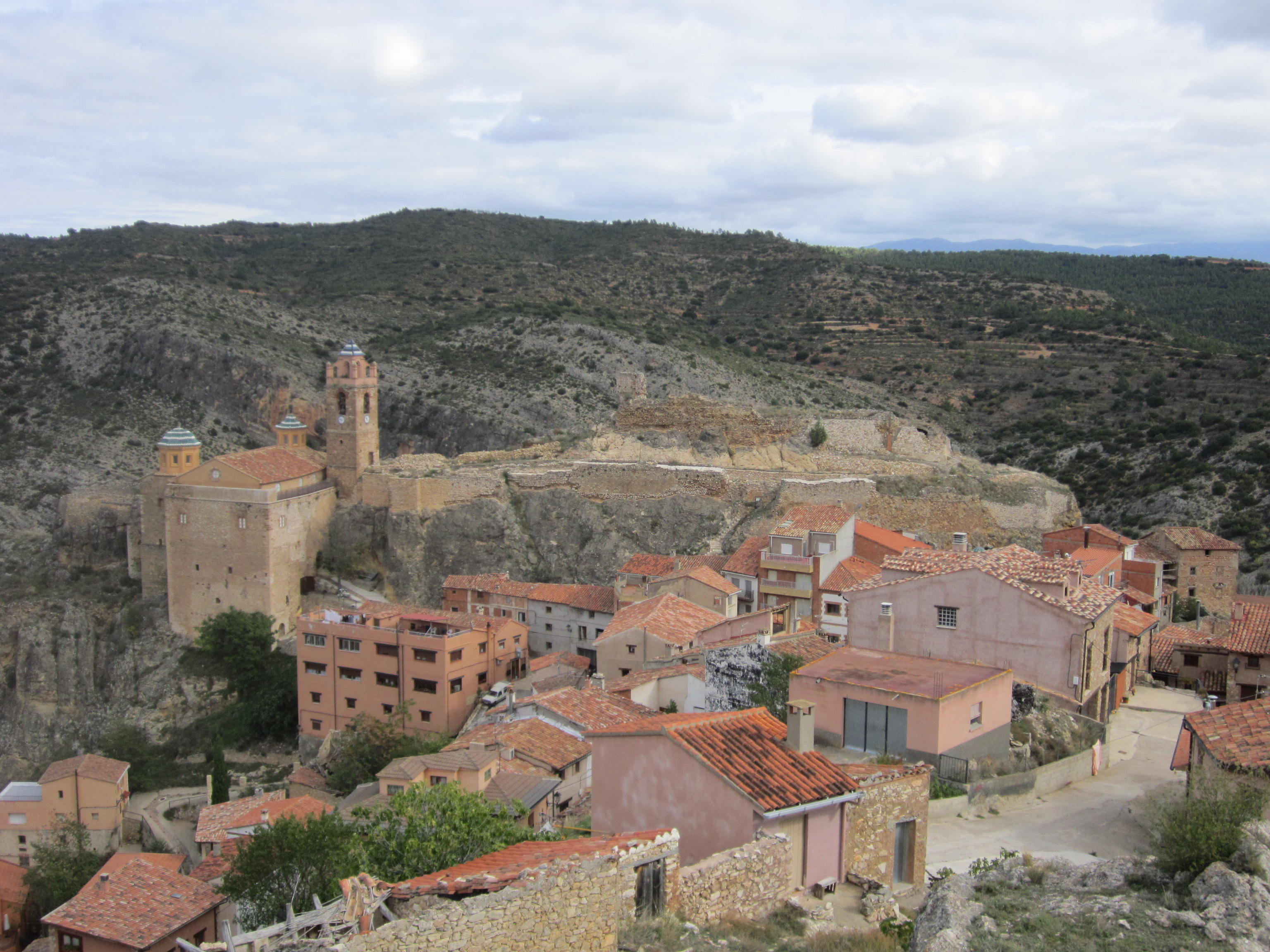

- Coat of arms

- Location in Spain Castielfabib (Spain)
- Coordinates: 40°7′50″N 1°18′16″W
- Country: Spain
- Autonomous community: Valencian Community
- Province: Valencia
- Comarca: Rincón de Ademuz
- Judicial district: Llíria

Government
  - Alcalde: Eduardo Aguilar Villalba

Area
  - Total: 106.3 km^{2} (41.0 sq mi)
- Elevation: 927 m (3,041 ft)

Population (2025-01-01)
  - Total: 284
  - Density: 2.67/km^{2} (6.92/sq mi)
- Demonym(s): Castielero, castielera
- Time zone: UTC+1 (CET)
  - Summer (DST): UTC+2 (CEST)
- Postal code: 46141
- Official language(s): Spanish
- Website: Official website

Castielfabib is a municipality in the comarca of Rincón de Ademuz in the Valencian Community, Spain.

== Geography ==
Known as "the small Albarracín", Castielfabib is located on a hill near the right bank of the river Ebrón. Located in the northwest corner of Rincon de Ademuz, it is mountainous with elevation ranging between 800 and 1,550 metres (2,600 and 5,100 ft). The most important points of elevation are: Mill Creek (1,338 m), Peña de Águila (1,112 m), Peral (1481 m), Cabezo (1,442 m), Macarron (1,222 m), Umbria La Muela (1,068 m) and Cross of the Three Kingdoms (1,552 m), so named because its summit joined the old kingdoms of Aragon, Castile and Valencia. The river Turia flows from the north, serving as the border with Teruel. It flows on the east of Riodeva, bordering Torre Baja. Ebrón River crosses the territory from northwest to southeast, flowing into Turia, the boulevard of Palomarejos runs north and comes to the precipice of the Canaleja. The climate is continental, with prevailing winds from the north and east, the latter bringing rains in April.

=== Civil parishes ===
In the municipality of Castielfabib, there are the following civil parishes (pedanías):

- Arroyo Cerezo
- Cuesta del Rato
- Mas de Jacinto
- Mas de los Mudos
- Los Santos

=== Bordering towns ===
The municipality of Castielfabib shares borders with the towns of Ademuz, Torrebaja and Vallanca, all of them situated in the province of Valencia.

Farther afield to the west, the municipality borders Salvacañete in the province of Cuenca, Castilla-La Mancha; Tormón, Veguillas de la Sierra, El Cuervo, Tramacastiel and Libros of the province of Teruel, Aragon to the north and the north-east.

== History ==
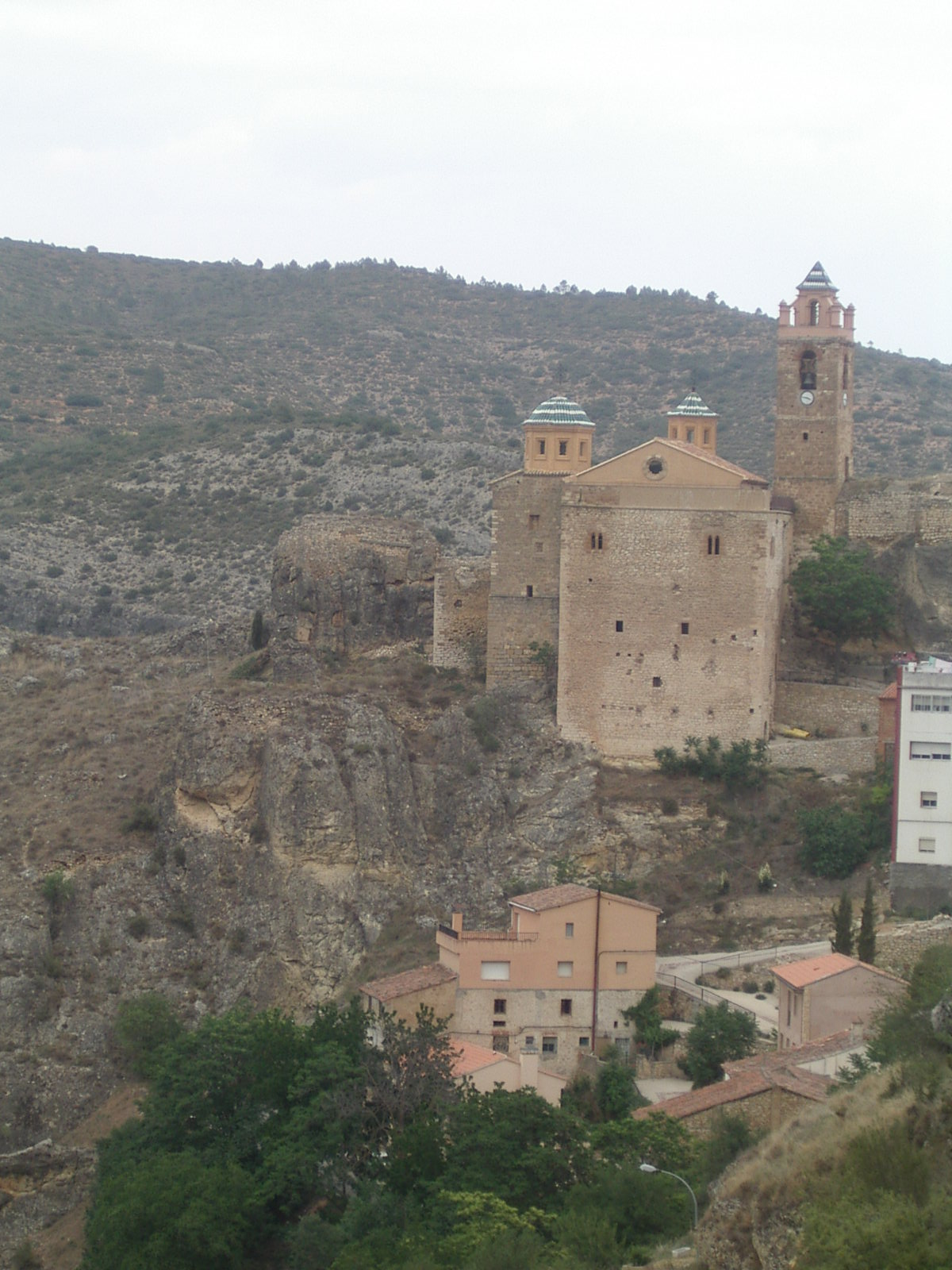
View of the church-fortress of Castielfabib

In Soreico Solana, there are remnants of Bronze Age, Iron Age, and Iberian cultures. West of the town, Faber Castle had been built on a Roman ruin. In 1971, a Roman tombstone fragment was found in Castillejo and has been preserved in the Museum of Prehistoric Valencia.

The area was captured in 1210 by Peter II of Aragon, recovered by Muslims shortly afterwards, and captured in the Reconquista by James I. Castielfabib, along with Ademuz, became part of the Kingdom of Valencia, and held in the royal domain under direct control of the crown. In 1304, the village was used as collateral for a loan from the Knights Templar. When they were disbanded, their rights fell to the Order of Montesa which collected tithes from Castielfabib and Ademuz. In 1390, the pope intervened in a dispute between the Montesa and the bishop over religious practises in the village. As a royal town, Castielfabib periodically sent a representative to the Generalitat Valenciana, the Valencian Parliament.

During the Peninsular War, Castielfabib was occupied by the French. In the civil wars of the 19th century it was occupied by Carlist forces, who rebuilt the castle; it was later demolished and won back by nationalist forces.

The township has remained virtually unchanged since medieval times and has only been a municipality at the expense of the territory of Torrebaja.

== Demographics ==
Demographic evolution of Castielfabib since 1842
Source: Instituto Nacional de Estadística

== Economy ==
The economy is traditionally based on agriculture and livestock. Rivers provide irrigation for apples, pears, vegetables and cereals. In the rain-fed area, cereal and vine are grown. The sheep are the most important, followed by pork and goat. Beekeeping is also practised.

The town entrance is from the road N-420, and the Tourism Office of the Rincón de Ademuz is located at "Los Centenares" of Castielfabib, along with a rural tourism complex. There is currently a youth hostel, with room service and swimming pool.

== Festivals and traditions ==
- A festival to Our Lady of Grace is held 7–11 September.
- A festival celebrates San Guillermo, the patron of Castielfabib, on 10 February.
- Easter celebrations have many traditions. Two poplar trees are brought from the banks of the river on Friday, to be planted in the square on Saturday, with a popular dance that night, the singing of the "Aurora" in the early hours of Sunday and bellringing and Sunday services.

== Cuisine ==
Castielfabib shares with the other towns of Rincon de Ademuz several recipes such as gachas (porridge), puchero and others, in which pork and its derivatives are central.

Almond, apple and other fruits are grown in the fertile plain of the River Ebrón and they are a key ingredient in the local bakery.

In recent times other local products such as mushrooms and tomatoes have been promoted.

== Notable people ==
- Francisco Novella (1581–1645), was an author and professor of rhetoric at the University of Valencia

== See also ==
- List of municipalities in Valencia
