= Francisco Candel Tortajada =

Spanish writer (1925-2007)

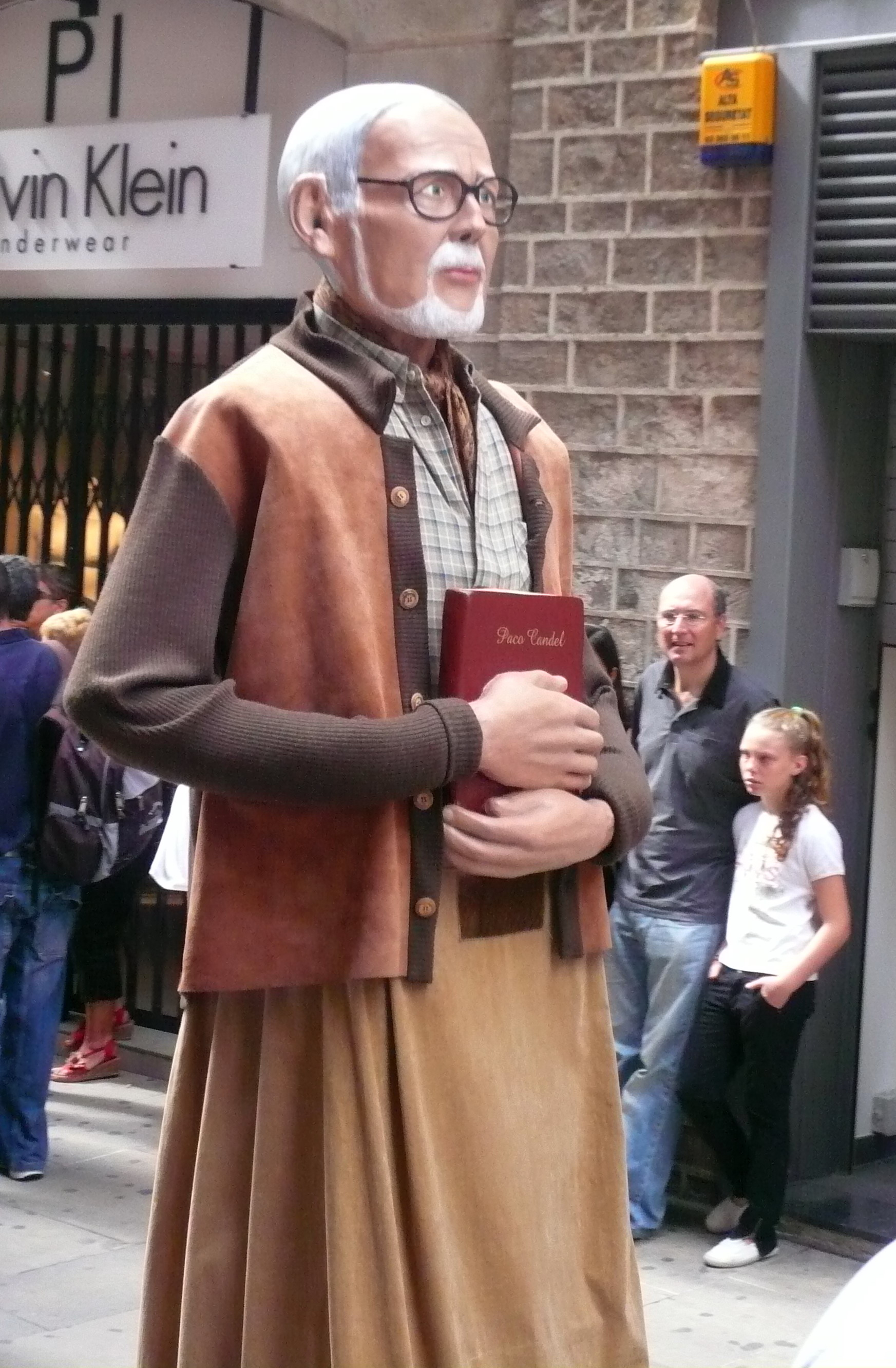
Processional giant with the image of Paco Candel in Barcelona

Francisco Candel Tortajada (May 31, 1925 in Casas Altas – November 23, 2007 in Barcelona, Spain), usually known as well as Paco Candel, was a Valencian-born writer and journalist who lived most of his life in Barcelona.

== Biography ==
Candel was born in a town of the Spanish-speaking comarca of Rincón de Ademuz, Valencia. When he was a child, his family moved to Barcelona.

Most of his contributions are devoted to studying the 20th-century Spanish migrations in the Barcelona metropolitan area. The book that made him famous was Els altres catalans (The Other Catalans in Catalan), a journalistic and sociological study about immigration, which heavily influenced the final decisions of the Assemblea de Catalunya on the issue in 1971.

He wrote several novels, tales, essays and articles. He also collaborated in several newspapers and magazines such as Tele/eXprés, Serra d'Or or Avui. He collaborated with Unified Socialist Party of Catalonia (PSUC). In 1977, he was elected as senator in the Spanish Courts for the Barcelona demarcation in the Entesa dels Catalans candidature. In 1979, he became a town councilor of Hospitalet de Llobregat as an independent for PSUC, where he assumed the responsibilities for the cultural department.

In 1983 he received the Creu de Sant Jordi. In 2003, the Generalitat de Catalunya awarded him its Golden Medal.

He died in 2007, after a long illness.

== Selected works ==
- 1956: Hay una juventud que aguarda ("There is a youth which awaits")
- 1957: Donde la ciudad cambia su nombre ("Where the city changes its name")
- 1959: Han matado a un hombre, han roto el paisaje ("They have killed a man, they have broken the landscape")
- 1964: Els altres Catalans ("The other Catalans")
- 1967: Parlem-ne ("Let's talk about it")
- 1973: Encara més sobre els altres Catalans ("Even more about the other Catalans")
- 1979: Un charnego en el Senado ("A charnego in the Senate")
- 1981: El Candel contra Candel ("Candel vs Candel")
- 1985: Els altres Catalans vint anys després ("The other Catalans twenty years later")
- 1988: La nova pobresa ("The new poverty")
