= Sesga Castle =

Castle in Ademuz, Spain

Coordinates: 40°1′23.04″N 1°12′46.67″W

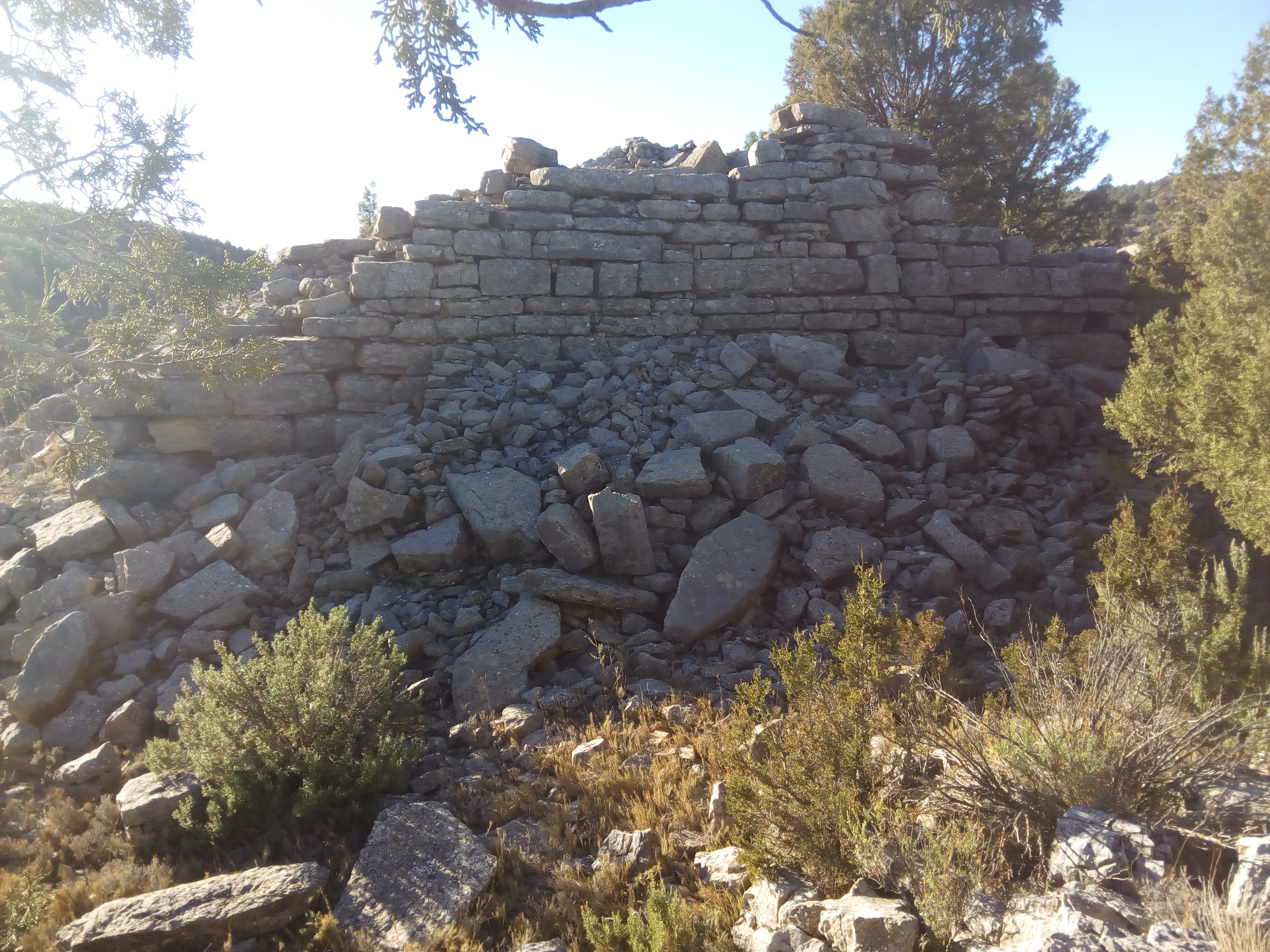
Eastern wall of the tower

Sesga Castle, which owes its name to the nearby hamlet, is also known as the "castillo de los moros" (Moors' castle). It is located in the municipality of Ademuz in the province of Valencia, Spain.

The castle is located southwest of the hamlet of Sesga, in a small, flat-topped mountain covered with pines and shrubs, besides a cliff which gives onto Sesga's ravine which holds the road from Sesga to Casas Bajas.

Sesga Castle is a small fortification which comprises the remains of what seems to be the base of a square tower, located in the eastern part of the fortress and surrounded by various levels of walls and a small, artificially-created platform. Although originally classified as a castle based on the ceramic shards found on its surface level, the place seems to be an Iberian or Celtiberian castrum. If this were its origins, the fortress' small dimensions would probably make it an outpost, similar way to Puntal dels Llops, whose internal distribution seems to mimic. Although there have been several illegal attempts, the site has not been excavated archaeologically.
