= Castle of Castielfabib =

Castle in Valencia, Spain

The Castle of Castielfabib is a castle in the Royal Village of Castielfabib, municipality of the comarca of the Rincón de Ademuz, in the Valencia province, Valencian Community (Spain).

== History ==
The castle's zone has been long populated, as evidenced by the findings of archaeological traces of the Iber and Roman periods.

The castle of Castielfabib seems to have an Arab origin, and it is known that it was conquered by Peter II of Aragon in 1210, after a long siege to the castle. When the conquest of the Prerincón ended, Peter II celebrated and presided over, during three days, General Corts of Aragon. After, the castle returned to the Muslim power, but it was definitively conquered by James I of Aragon.

Many wars occurred during the 14th century between the Crown of Aragon and the Crown of Castile, and this castle given its strategical position, was very important. It was also important in the Spanish Independence War, the Carlist Wars and the Spanish Civil War.

In 1835, during the First Carlist War (1833-1840), the castle was rebuilt. When the National troops took the castle, they demolished the new works.

== Description ==
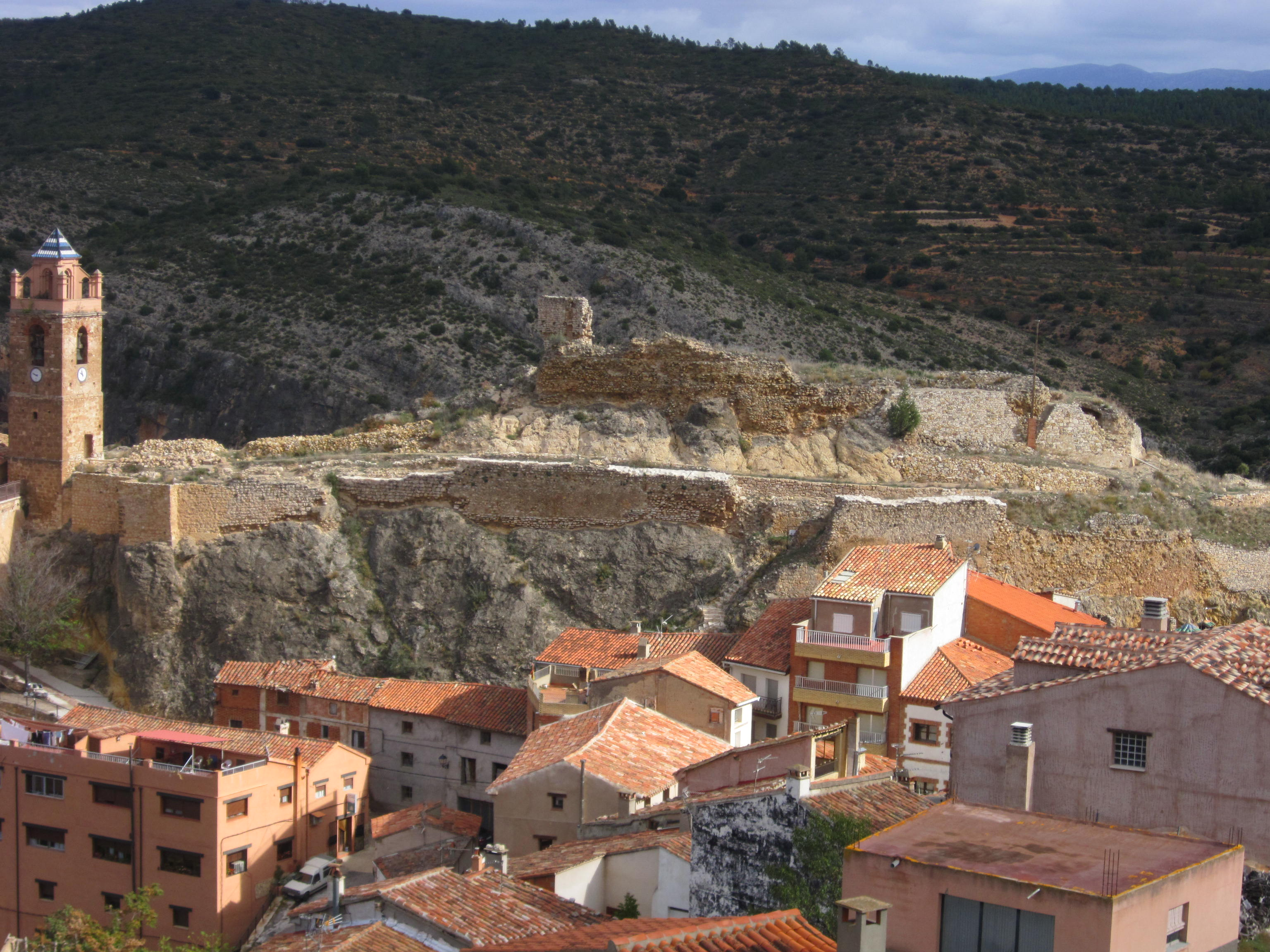
Partial view of the Castle of Castielfabib without the Tower of Homage-Church that is located on the left

There are a lot of remains of the castle in the village.

The keep is now the parochial church of Our Lady of the Angels. And it was recently restored. In this church exists remains of Gothic and Romanic paint. In the past this church had a rich heritage, but it was lost during the Spanish Civil War.

== Bibliography ==
- Eslava Blasco, Raúl: “Algunas consideraciones acerca de la heráldica de las villas de Castielfabib y Ademuz”, en la revista Ababol, nº 52. pp. 5–15. ISSN 1578-6978. Ademuz, 2007.
- Montesinos, J. y Poyato, C. (Ed.): Actas del Primer Simposio de La Cruz de los Tres Reinos. Espacio y tiempo en un territorio de frontera. Simposio Interregional Interuniversitario, celebrado en Ademuz el 25, 26 y 27 de julio de 2008. Edición de la Universitat de València y de la Universidad de Castilla-La Mancha. Cuenca, 2011. ISBN 978-84-8427-773-6.
