= Francisco Novella =

Francisco Novella may refer to:

- Francisco Novella Azabal Pérez y Sicardo (1769–1822), Spanish general in New Spain.
- Francisco Novella (Castielfabib) (1581–1645), professor of rhetoric in the University of Valencia.
