= Salvacañete =

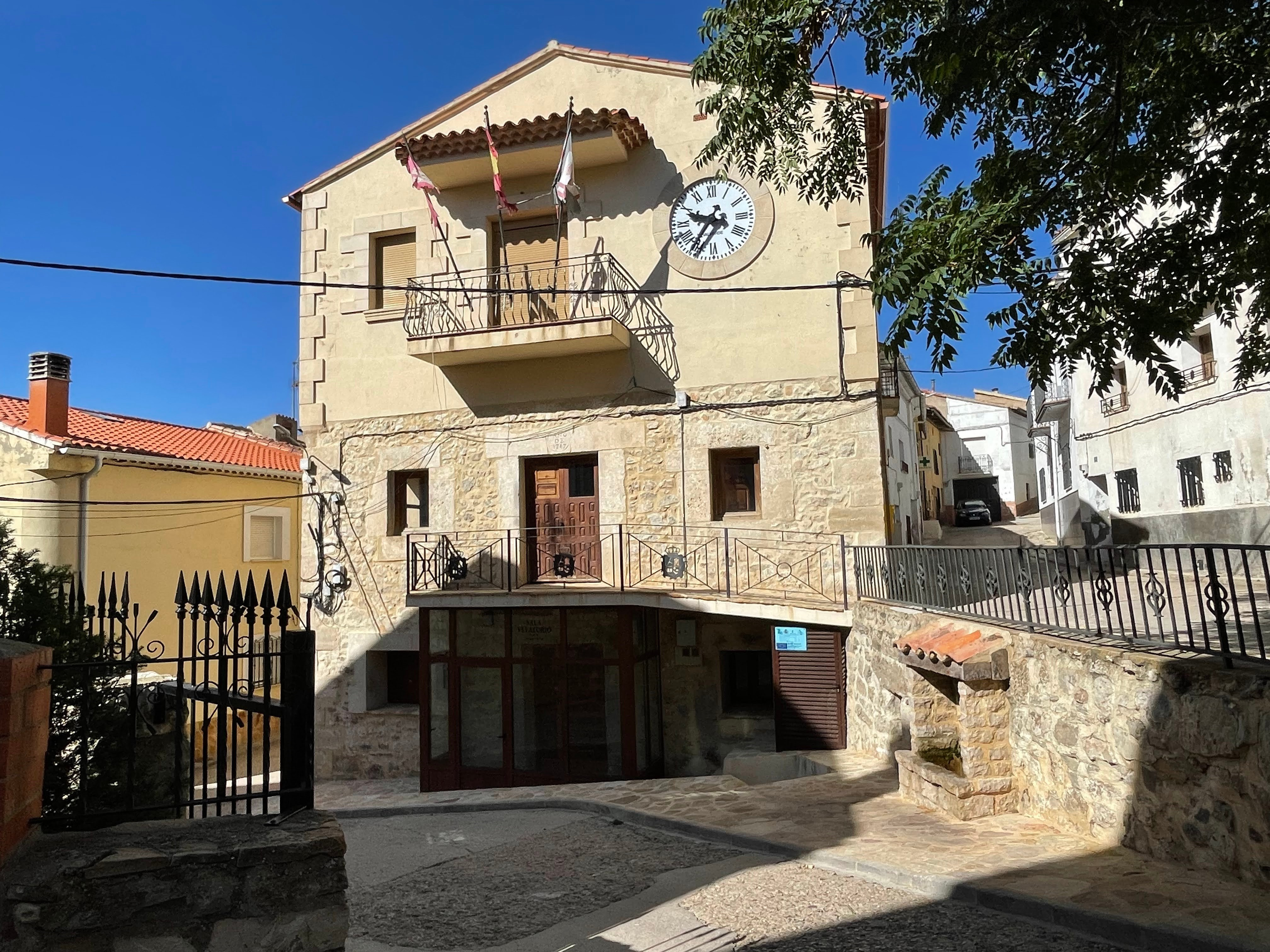
- Town Hall of Salvacañete

- Flag Coat of arms

- Location within Spain Location within Castilla-La Mancha
- Country: Spain
- Autonomous community: Castile-La Mancha
- Province: Cuenca
- Municipality: Salvacañete

Area
  - Total: 120 km^{2} (46 sq mi)

Population (2025-01-01)
  - Total: 300
  - Density: 2.5/km^{2} (6.5/sq mi)
- Time zone: UTC+1 (CET)
  - Summer (DST): UTC+2 (CEST)

Salvacañete (Spanish: [salβaˈkaɲete]) is a Spanish municipality in the autonomous community of Castilla-La Mancha in the province of Cuenca. According to the 2023 census (INE), the municipality has a population of 300 inhabitants. On January 12, 2021, a minimum temperature of −16.2 °C (2.8 °F) was registered.

== Geography ==
Salvacañete is part of the Serranía Baja, located 87 kilometers (54 miles) from Cuenca. The municipality is traversed by the national highway N-420 between kilometers 514 and 525, as well as local roads leading to Alcalá de la Vega and Toril y Masegoso.

The landscape of the municipality is shaped by the mountains of the Serranía de Cuenca and the Cabriel river, which runs from north to south, accompanied by numerous streams. The most prominent mountains include the Peña del Ocejón at the boundary with the province of Teruel, the Cruz de los Tres Reinos at the juncture of the provinces of Teruel, Valencia, and Cuenca, and the Modorro. The altitude in the area ranges from 1,629 meters (5344 feet) at Peña del Ocejón in the north to 1,150 meters (3772 feet) along the Cabriel River in the south, with the town itself situated at 1,209 meters (3966 feet) above sea level.

== History ==
The first confirmed human presence in the area dates back to Roman times. The most significant find is the so-called "Treasure", publicly revealed in 1934, consisting of fourteen Roman denarii, with the most recent dated between 100–95 BCE, two drachmas from Arse, and sixty-three Iberian denarii. The treasure's concealment is estimated to have occurred around 95 BCE, during the Iberian uprising (98–94 BCE). Part of this archaeological find is exhibited in the Provincial Historical Museum. Additionally, near the shrine of the local patroness, the Virgin of Valdeoña, there are remnants of a Roman villa with a mosaic featuring geometric designs.

The historical record next references Salvacañete in the Middle Ages. According to Trifón Muñoz Soliva, during El Cid Campeador's numerous campaigns against Saracen forces on his way through Aragon to Valencia, he forged an alliance with Abu Mernan Huzeil de Aben Razin. Believing it most prudent to advance from Toledo through these Cuenca lands, El Cid constructed a fortress in La Frontera, then passed through Beteta and Molina, then Cañete and Castielfabib, which he sought to rebuild, before reaching Valencia to besiege the city. The most logical route between these two towns would have passed through what is now Salvacañete.

Documents confirm that Salvacañete was regarded as a hamlet of Moya during the 15th century, but with the creation of the Marquesado de Moya in 1475, it became a recognized town and part of the marquisate:

"The Marquesado de Moya included the following towns: Henarejos, Cardenete, Carboneras, San Martín de Boniches, Villar del Humo, Pajaroncillo, Campillos Sierra, Huerta y Laguna Marquesado, Zafrilla, Tejadillos, Salinas, Salvacañete, Boniches, Alcalá de la Vega, El Cubillo, Algarra, Garcimolina, Talayuelas, Aliaguilla, Narboneta, Garaballa, Campillos de Paravientos, Santa Cruz de Moya, Campalbo, Casas de Pedro Alonso, Santo Domingo and los Huertos."

Salvacañete did not gain further historical significance until the 19th century, during the War of Independence against Napoleonic France, where local resistance, including a guerrilla band led by Tío Pedro, engaged in frequent surprise attacks against the French forces. After the war, the region became a hideout for former guerrillas who turned to banditry, with the most notorious group being led by "El Viejo", which terrorized the Sierra de Teruel, the Maestrazgo, and the Serranía de Cuenca.

In 1822, Salvacañete was definitively assigned to the corregimiento or judicial district of Cañete. During the Carlist Wars, it was the site of several significant military maneuvers. By the mid-19th century, the town had a recorded population of 994 inhabitants. The Diccionario geográfico-estadístico-histórico de España y sus posesiones de Ultramar by Pascual Madoz provides the following description of Salvacañete:

SALVACAÑETE: a town with its own council in the province and diocese of Cuenca (8 1/2 leagues), judicial district of Cañete (1 1/2), territorial court of Albacete (21), and general captaincy of Castilla la Nueva (Madrid 32). Situated in the northeasternmost part of the province on uneven terrain and on the left bank of the Cabriel River: its climate is cold, exposed to northern and western winds, and not prone to diseases. It comprises 250 houses, including the town hall; a parish church, served by a resident priest, a benefice holder, and an assistant for its annex Salinas de Fuente del Manzano; the town is supplied with good water. The term borders the territory of Terriente, province of Teruel to the north; Algarra to the east; Alcalá de la Vega to the south, and Salinas de Fuente del Manzano to the west: within its jurisdiction are 28 estates or cottages mentioned in their respective places and 2 iron factories: the terrain is very uneven and populated with pines, oaks, holm oaks, and other shrubs; the cultivated part is 2,000 fanegas (a Spanish land measure), and the rest is used as excellent quality pasture: the aforementioned river crosses the term from north to south; the roads are local, and the one from Teruel to Cuenca also passes through the town, but they and the latter are in poor condition; the mail is received from the capital of the province. Produce: wheat, barley, rye, oats, and some legumes; livestock is reared, including sheep and cattle; there is game such as hares, partridges, rabbits, roe deer, and deer, and fishing of trout, barbel, and other fish. Industry: agriculture and livestock farming, 2 iron factories, a flour mill, and some local textile looms. Population: 250 households, 994 souls. Productive capital: 2,391,600 reales de vellón.

After these tumultuous times, the town experienced relative stability, although economic activities like agriculture, livestock farming, and rural craftsmanship remained modest. In recent decades, Salvacañete, like many rural areas in Spain, has faced challenges related to population decline and economic shifts, leading to changes in its traditional way of life.

== Demographics ==
According to the 2023 census (INE), Salvacañete has a population of 300 inhabitants.

Historical population

Year	Pop.	±%
1842	994	—
1857	1,243	+25.1%
1860	1,405	+13.0%
1877	1,457	+3.7%
1887	1,474	+1.2%
1897	1,529	+3.7%
1900	1,500	−1.9%

Year	Pop.	±%
1910	1,579	+5.3%
1920	1,473	−6.7%
1930	1,524	+3.5%
1940	1,523	−0.1%
1950	1,400	−8.1%
1960	1,086	−22.4%
1970	651	−40.1%

Year	Pop.	±%
1981	360	−44.7%
1991	361	+0.3%
2001	329	−8.9%
2011	319	−3.0%
2021	290	−9.1%

- 1842 and 1877–2021: De jure population according to the population censuses of the INE.
- 1857 and 1860: De facto population according to the INE population censuses.

Following the migration trends of the 1960s and 1970s, many inhabitants left Salvacañete to move to large cities. The three main destinations were Barcelona, Madrid, and Valencia, along with their metropolitan areas.

The habitat is rural, consisting of a set of forms and activities linked to country life. The town's layout is well-suited for defense. It shares the structure common to many Castilian towns: a central round square in the middle of the town, houses arranged in a closed and contiguous manner, as well as narrow streets.
