= Francisco Novella (Castielfabib) =

Francisco Novella, was born in Castielfabib, in the comarca of the Rincón de Ademuz (then within the Kingdom of Valencia) in the year 1581, and he died in the city of Valencia in 1645. He was a professor of rhetoric in the University of Valencia, from June 2, 1615 until his death in 1645. He published a rhetoric manual in 1621 and a second edition of this in 1641.

== Bibliography ==
- Eslava Blasco, Raúl: "Noticias sobre escritores del Rincón de Ademuz en los siglos XVII y XVIII, según sus contemporáneos".
