= Maketo =

Pejorative term for non-Basque migrants in the Basque Country

Maketo in Basque (or maqueto, in Spanish) is a pejorative term used to describe non-Basque migrants from other parts of Spain who have migrated into the Basque Country, especially those who cannot speak the Basque language.

The term's origins lie in the industrialization of Biscay in the late 19th century. Mine workers often came from outside the Basque Country and were referred to as "maketos" by the local population. The word's use and negative connotation were spread by writer Sabino Arana, who is often considered the father of Basque nationalism.

== Biscay in the last third of the 19th century ==
Biscay in Spain.

In the last third of the 19th century, Biscay underwent a rapid industrialization process based on iron mining and steelmaking. One of its consequences was the arrival of thousands of emigrants from other provinces. The 1877 census already shows the weight of the emigrant population, which represented 19.5% of the total, but this percentage was much higher in the mining and urban area of Bilbao, while it remained low in the rural areas. This contrast can be seen in the percentage of localities such as Guernica, 5.8%, compared to 38% in Bilbao, 36% in Baracaldo, 41% in Santurtzi or 65% in San Salvador del Valle. Emigration explains the great demographic growth of Biscay in those years, where the population went from 195,864 inhabitants in 1877 to 311,361 in 1900, reaching a population density of 141 inhabitants per square kilometer, which was similar to that of other European industrial areas.

The vast majority of the labor force employed in the mines and factories was foreign, while Biscayans occupied the positions of foremen and other intermediate positions, in addition to the fact that the owners of the mines were also Biscayans. This was explained in a report prepared by the Institute of Social Reforms on the workers in the mines in 1904:

The workers from Biscay are in a small minority, to the point that it can be stated, without fear of being mistaken, that more than 70 percent of the workers who work in the mines come mostly from the provinces of La Coruña, Lugo, Orense, Pontevedra, León, Soria, Oviedo, Palencia, Zamora, Salamanca and Burgos. The first six provinces provided the largest contingent. The Biscayan worker is rarely a laborer; he is generally found working as a foreman or listero, while the Galicians, Asturians, Leonese and Castilians, by exception, carry out work other than that of a laborer [...]

In the same report, a distinction was made between workers with stable residence, foreign or not, and itinerant workers, almost always working for a period of less than three years, who lived in appalling conditions under the supervision of foremen. It was in this context that the first workers' organizations were born, hitherto non-existent in Biscay and in the Basque Country in general. They were the work of the socialists headed by a man who arrived from abroad, Facundo Perezagua, who, according to socialist Julián Zugazagoitia, was a “lean, wiry, indomitable individual, possibly a descendant of Toledo Jews (because of his physical appearance), who acts as a revolutionary ferment in the Christian paradise of the Biscayan mines”. In 1886, he constituted the first socialist grouping in Bilbao, whose members were also emigrants, and which was followed by those of Ortuella (1887), La Arboleda (1888), Sestao (1888), Las Carreras (1890), San Salvador del Valle (1891), Gallarta, Begoña and Erandio (1896).

The irruption of the socialist movement in Biscayan society took place in May 1890 with the general mining strike, in which the workers resorted to violence to extend it, and which ended with their victory by achieving a reduction in the working day. Serious labor conflicts and strikes were a practically unknown phenomenon in Biscay and in the Basque Country, which until then had lived in a kind of “sweet arcadia”, in the words of the socialist Zugazagoitia. As Ricardo Miralles has pointed out, at the end of the strike, “several phenomena chained together became commonplace before the astonished and bewildered eyes of the public opinion and the official media: the social question, as the bourgeois press of the time called it; the hegemony of organized socialism, to which the mining bosses systematically denied its representativeness, and, above all, the practice of a type of workers' pressure to obtain success in their demands that abruptly broke the traditional social stability. From that moment on, the history of Biscay took a turn that placed it in the sphere of contemporary social conflict par excellence, the workers' conflict”.

== Use and origin of the word ==
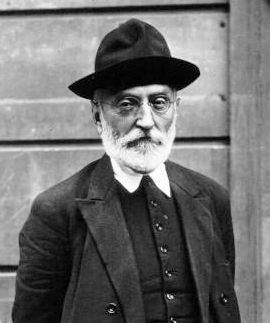
Portrait of Miguel de Unamuno in 1925.

To designate the workers who came from outside, the foremen of the mines used derogatory and racist names such as “our Chinese”, “belarri-motxas” (“short ears”, referring to non-Basques) or "azur baltzak" (“blacks or liberals in the bones”, an expression that comes from Carlism). The most used, however, was “maketos”, which was also used by employers and other social and political groups, as denounced by the socialists, among whom the young Miguel de Unamuno stood out. Unamuno wrote several articles on the subject in the socialist newspaper La Lucha de Clases, and later, in the liberal newspaper El Heraldo de Madrid. In one of those articles, Unamuno said:

The name maketo, of Castilian origin, comes from the mining region, where it was used at first by the natives of that region, in the sense of new-comers or intruders, and with them, the workers of the country, the poor braceros who came from all over Spain to earn their wages with their work, enriching the owners of the mines, Biscayan, for the most part. From there, it has spread to all of Biscay. [...] They blame the so-called invasion of evils that the economic process itself carries with it. It is the usual refrain, based on profound ignorance of the social dynamism [...]

Ainhoa Arozamena picks up the idea that the appellative "maketo" comes from the mining area of Biscay, and quotes Sabino Arana to corroborate it. Arana wrote that its use was initially restricted to the area “from Galdakao to Portugalete and from Mungia to Balmaseda”. Thus, according to Arozamena, “maketo” would derive from the Biscayan word or voice "makutua", which means "wrapper", since the miners from the Basque Country called those who came from outside "makutuak", “meaning with that ‘those of the wrapper’, or those of the house on their backs”. This same interpretation is made by Juan José Solozábal, who says that the word, "with a derogatory intention, was applied to the immigrant workers who came from other provinces to work in the mines with their poor little bundle, or maco, on their backs”.

However, it has also been pointed out that the word “maketo” could derive from the “northwestern regional voice of unknown origin, probably pre-Roman” magüeto, as it appears in the Diccionario crítico etimológico de la lengua castellana, or from "meteco" (meaning "foreigner") of ancient Athens.

== The "antimaquetism" of Sabino Arana ==
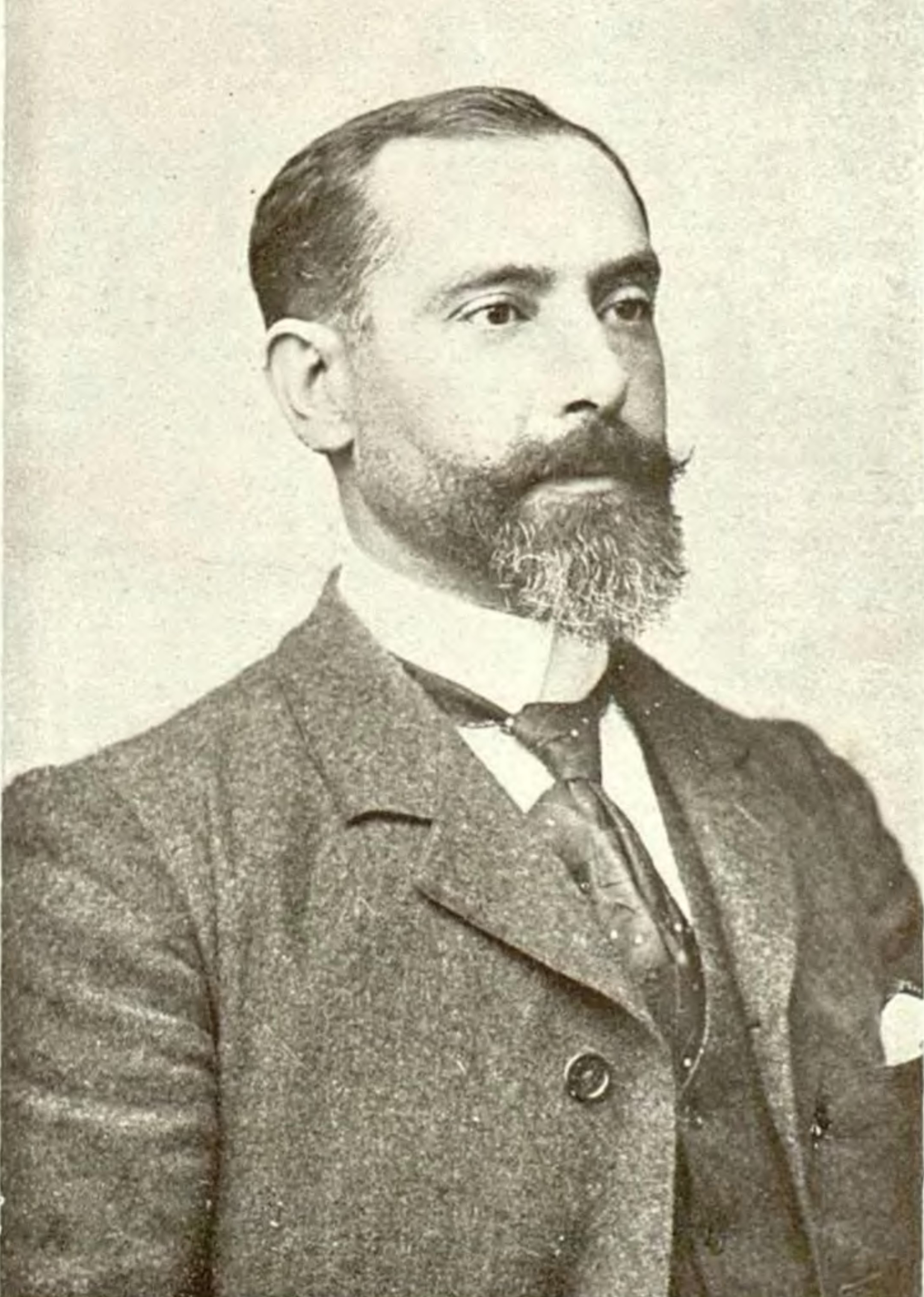
Portrait of Sabino Arana.

The father of Basque nationalism, Sabino Arana, identified the “being” of the “Basque nation” — understood in an essentialist way, and therefore, independent of the will of its inhabitants — with the Catholic religion and the Basque race. The language, Basque, appeared in second place. Hence, he wrote in the opuscule Errores catalanistas (1894): “if we were given the choice between a Biscay populated by maketos who only spoke Basque and a Biscay populated by Biscayans who only spoke Castilian, we would choose the latter without hesitation, because it is preferable the Biscayan substance with exotic accidents that can be eliminated and replaced by natural ones, to an exotic substance with Biscayan properties that could never change it”.

According to Arana, the Biscayans — like the rest of the Basques, all of them defined racially, not linguistically or culturally — had been “degenerating” in a long process that culminated in the 19th century with the subordination of the Fueros to the Spanish Constitution (Note: In 1894, Arana wrote: “In the year 39, Vizcaya fell definitively under the power of Spain. Our homeland Biscay, from the independent nation it was, with its own power and rights, became on that date a Spanish province, a part of the most degraded and abject nation in Europe.”) and with the ‘invasion’ of the Spanish immigrants, who had brought with them modern anti-religious ideas, such as "impiety, all kinds of immorality, blasphemy, crime, free thought, unbelief, socialism, anarchism...", as well as having caused the decline of the Basque language. In an article significantly titled “Our Moors”, he stated: “The maketo: behold the enemy!”. Subsequently, on June 30, 1876, Cánovas de Castillo promulgated the Spanish constitution of 1876, which further undermined the institutions and laws of the peninsular Basques.

Thus, as Miguel de Unamuno had already observed in his time, “antimaquetism” became the axis around which Sabine nationalism revolved, expressing with it the rejection of the consequences of industrialization, among which was the “maketa invasion”, as it was called by the middle and popular classes attached to traditional culture.

Arana identified the maketo with the Spanish, (Note: He writes: “In a word, every Spaniard is a maqueto, whether Catholic or atheist; and Maquetania, all of Spain with its adjacent islands.”) extending the depravities and vices attributed to the immigrant maketo to the Spanish as a whole. In this way, Arana turned the maketo into the counter-figure of the Biscayan and the Basque, whose presence was responsible for the “degeneration” that Basque society was experiencing. “The Euskerino society, twinned and confused with the Spanish people, which spoils the minds and hearts of its children and kills their souls, is, therefore, far from its purpose, it's losing its children, it's sinning against God”, writes Arana.

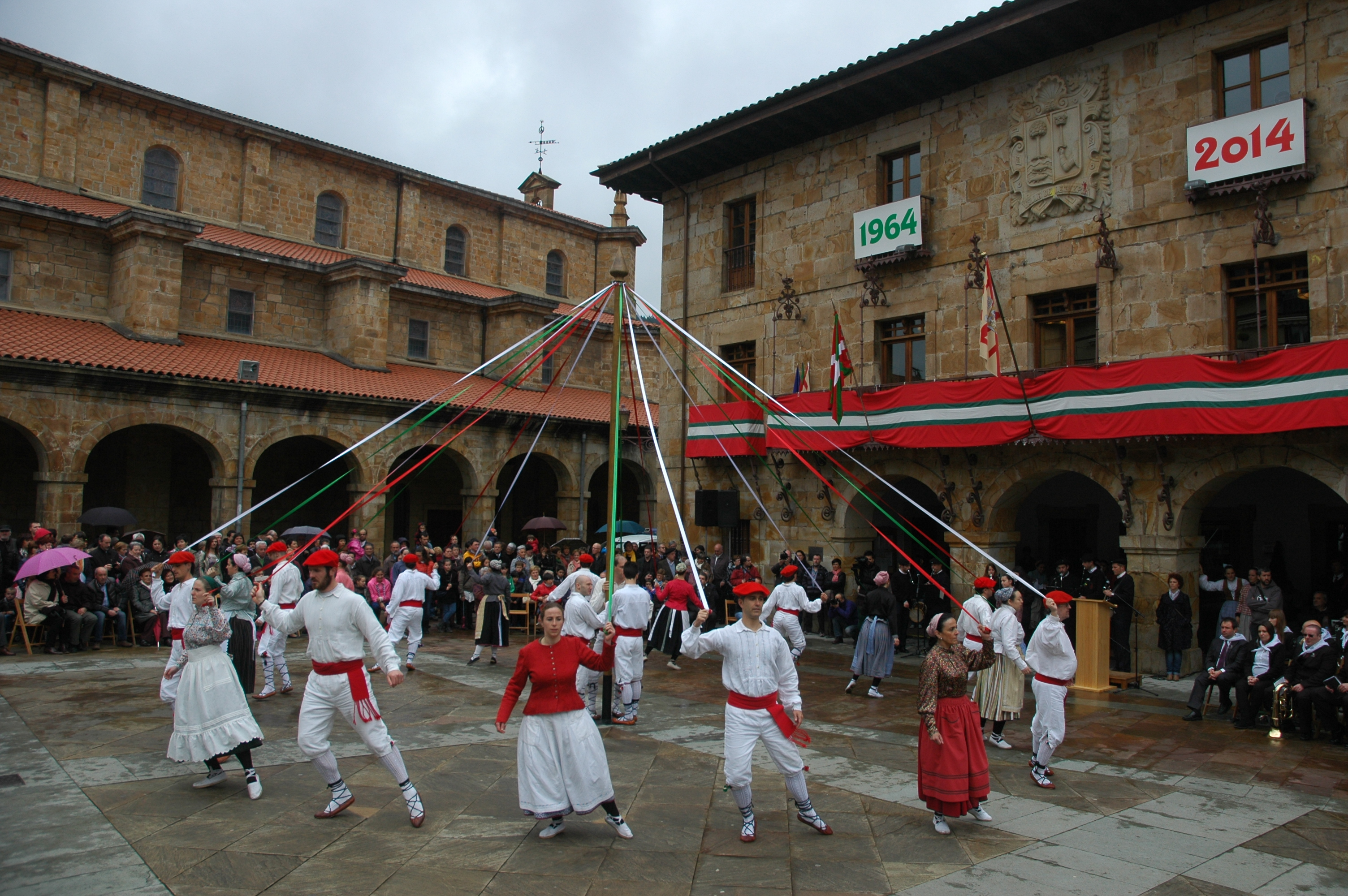
Zinta dantza (Legazpi, 2014), a traditional Basque dance.

An example of antimaquetism is Arana's crusade against the Spanish dance “agarrao”, which for him synthesized the “depravity” to which the “Spanish race” had reached, as opposed to the traditional Biscayan dance. This is how he explained it in the article ¿Qué somos?, published in the newspaper Bizkaitarra:

See a Biscayan dance presided over by the ecclesiastical and civil authorities, and you will feel your spirits rejoice to the sound of the txistu, the alboka or the dulzaina, and to see united in admirable consortium the simplest candor and the wildest joy; witness a Spanish dance, and if the light, disgusting and cynical embrace of the sexes does not cause you nausea, the robustness of your stomach is proven [...]

The comparison is extended to the family:

The Biscayan is a lover of the family and his home (as for the former, it is known that adultery is very rare in families not affected by the maketo influence, that is, in the genuinely Biscayan families [...]). Among the Spaniards, adultery is frequent, in the elevated classes as well as in the humble ones, and the affection for the home in the latter is null, because they do not have it.

Arana's descriptions of the maketos/Spaniards become increasingly negative, as in the article Un pueblo caracterizado, published in El Correo Vasco of Bilbao in June 1899:

It is the people of blasphemy and the razor... Relatively few are those in Spain who do not use a razor, although fewer are those who do not blaspheme. That is why the Spanish people are characterized by the pimp who wields an enormous Albacete knife, and the razor is considered throughout the world as a weapon of exclusive use among the Spanish.

So, for Arana, the first step to stop the “degeneration” of the Basque race would be to isolate it, to immunize it from the maketos, from the invading Spanish race:

It is necessary to isolate ourselves from the maketos in all orders of life. Otherwise, here, in this land on which we tread, it is not possible to work for the glory of God [...] Let it be said, in these times of slavery, that there is in Biscay a very numerous Spanish colony, but never that we are confused with the maketos. Let us all unite under the same flag, let us found purely Basque societies, let us write Basque newspapers, let us create Basque theaters, Basque schools and even Basque charitable institutions. Let everything our eyes see, our ears hear, our mouths speak, our hands write and our hearts feel be Basque.

Hence Sabino Arana's radical opposition to mixed marriages. In his 1898 play De fuera vendrá, the brother of the young protagonist proclaims:

But will it be possible for a Spaniard to enter my family? Will it be possible for my only sister to become the wife of a maketo? I assure you that, if my sister marries a Spaniard, I will never speak to her again.

The battle to be waged against the maketos is summarized in this poem by Arana:

| Basque | Spanish | English |
|---|---|---|
| Antziñeko enda zar, Garbi ta bakana Orain maketuenak Dagona betuta, Biztuko da ta betik Jagiko da gora, Eta bizkaitarena Bizkaya txango da | La antigua estirpe pura y limpia, la que ahora por los maquetos se halla aplastada resucitará y se alzará de su postración hasta las alturas y de los bizkaitarras Vizcaya será. | The ancient lineage, pure and clean, the one that now is crushed by the maketos, will resurrect and rise from its prostration to the heights, and of the bizkaitarras Biscay will be. |

=== The socialists' response ===
Arana considered socialism to be an “anti-Christian” and “antibascan” ideology, but he did not fight the socialists as such. Rather, he fought them as maketos:

There will hardly be a dozen Euskerians who are real socialists here, with knowledge of the ideas and complete conviction. And how could it be otherwise? The basarritarres, the true sons of our race, the only ones from whom our Homeland can hope for salvation, were they to unite and associate with the dregs of the maketo people, if corrupt in their cities, more degraded in their fields?

The socialists responded and, among them, Tomás Meabe, a former nationalist, stood out. In one of the articles he published in La Lucha de Clases, he wrote:

It is true that they [men from other lands] also contribute to the public burdens, that they have enriched their exploiters, that they have worked like beasts and eaten worse than them, that they have gambled their lives at all hours, that they have in their homes an eternal drama of misery... But no matter, they are insulted and showered with expletives, they are invaders, they are perfidious, they are lazy, they are maketos.

== See also ==
- Xarnego, a derogatory term referring to internal migrants to Catalonia
