= Xarnego =

Catalan and Spanish pejorative

Xarnego (Catalan pronunciation: [ʃərˈnɛɣu]) in Catalan or charnego in Spanish is a pejorative or descriptive term used primarily in the 1950s–70s in Catalonia (Spain) to refer to economic migrants from other regions of Spain. In its modern usage, it refers to Catalans with recent heritage from Spanish-speaking parts of Spain. The word is used solely in the context of internal migration.

As of 1999 it was estimated that over 60% of Catalans descended from 20th century migrations from other parts of Spain, and over 1.1 million Catalans are of Andalusian origin alone.

== Historical context ==
Between 1950 and 1975 a second wave of a million and half immigrants arrived from other less developed parts of Spain, particularly Andalusia and Extremadura, where hunger and economic hardship was prevalent. These new immigrants represented 44% of the total growth of the Catalan population during this period. This immigration resulted from the high demand for cheap labour resulting from the new economic policy of "desarrollismo" of Francoist Spain, which involved huge investments in sectors such as transport and infrastructure primarily aiming to stimulate the tourism, heavy industry and new industries such as the car industry with the creation of the SEAT car company and the building of its factory in the free-zone of Barcelona in 1953. Such industries, the availability of jobs and higher salaries in the Barcelona region would stimulate two decades of immigration from rural areas throughout Spain - a phenomenon comparable to other large scale international migrations throughout history due to the volume of people and geographic distances involved.

== Usage of term and discrimination during the 20th century ==
The wave of immigration led to a new rise in xenophobia in Catalonia, with the generalization of the derogatory term "xarnego" to refer to these new Catalans. The term, originally meaning "mongrel", was historically used in southern France to refer to French people mixed with Spanish/Catalan heritage. Upon its introduction in Catalonia, it referred to immigrants from non-Catalan speaking regions of Spain - in other words, a foreigner to Catalonia. Eventually it also took on a linguistic sense referring to those Catalans who do not speak Catalan, without losing its ethnic, and classist connotations. The Catalan language thus became an important criterion to distinguish between "them" (the immigrants) and "us" (the Catalans). Francisco Candel described the situation in "Los otros catalanes" (1964) and later defined himself as a Charnego in the senate (1979).

== In film ==
- The Bilingual Lover, based upon a novel by Barcelonian writer Juan Marsé, is a 1993 film in which the protagonist is a working-class Catalan man who reinvents himself as a charnego to recover his fetishist wife.

== See also ==
- Maketo, a Basque pejorative for immigrants from the rest of Spain
