= Toril y Masegoso =

- municipality
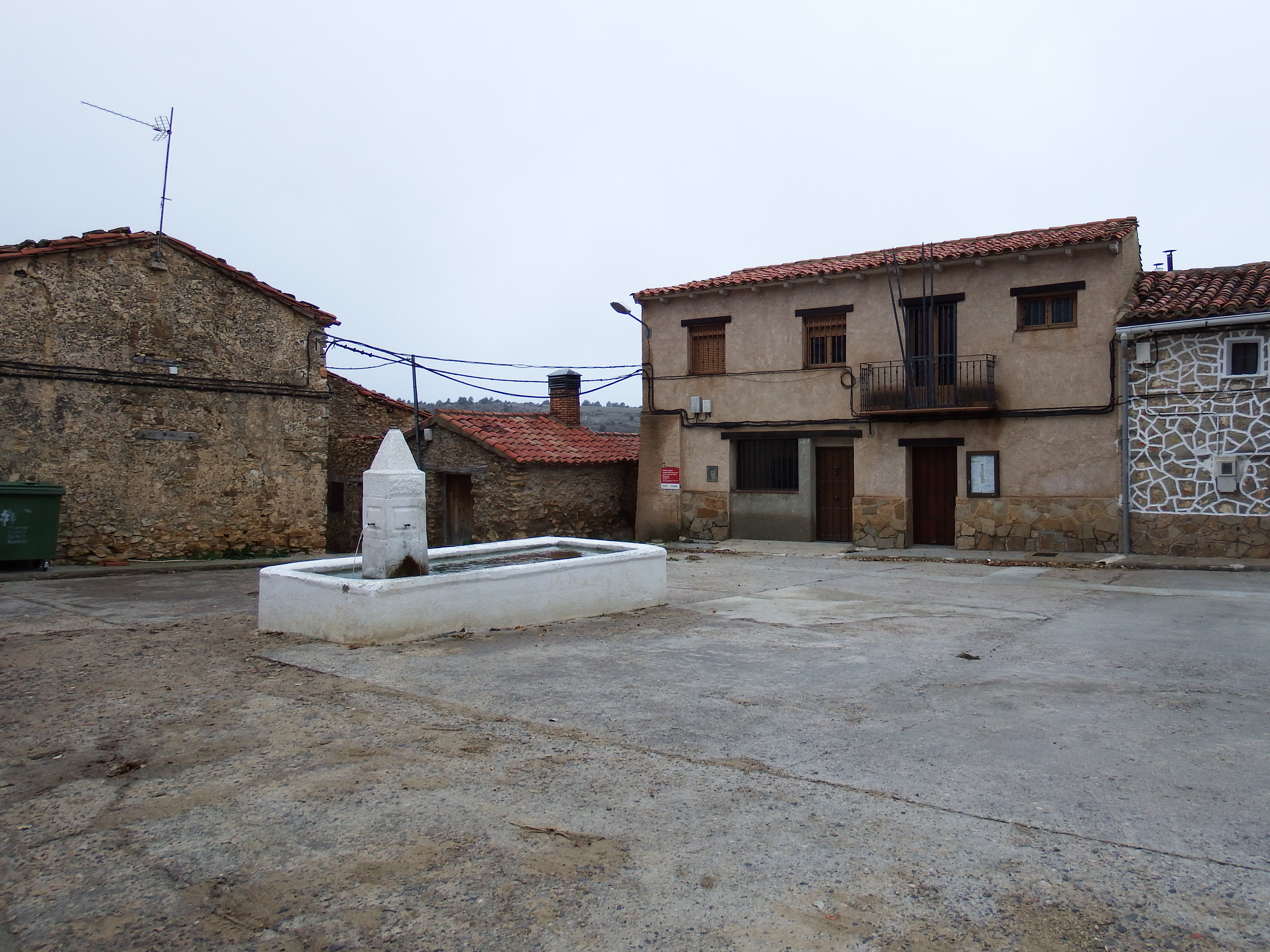
- Town hall

- Flag Coat of arms

- Location within Spain
- Coordinates: 40°15′N 1°29′W
- Country: Spain
- Autonomous community: Aragon
- Province: Teruel

Area
  - Total: 34.67 km^{2} (13.39 sq mi)
- Elevation: 1,490 m (4,890 ft)

Population (2025-01-01)
  - Total: 31
  - Density: 0.89/km^{2} (2.3/sq mi)
- Time zone: UTC+1 (CET)
  - Summer (DST): UTC+2 (CEST)

Toril y Masegoso is a municipality located in the province of Teruel, Aragon, Spain. According to the 2004 census (INE), the municipality had a population of 31 inhabitants. As of 2011, Toril y Masegoso's mayor was Javier Dalda Borja.

== See also ==
- List of municipalities in Teruel
