= Puebla de San Miguel =

- Municipality
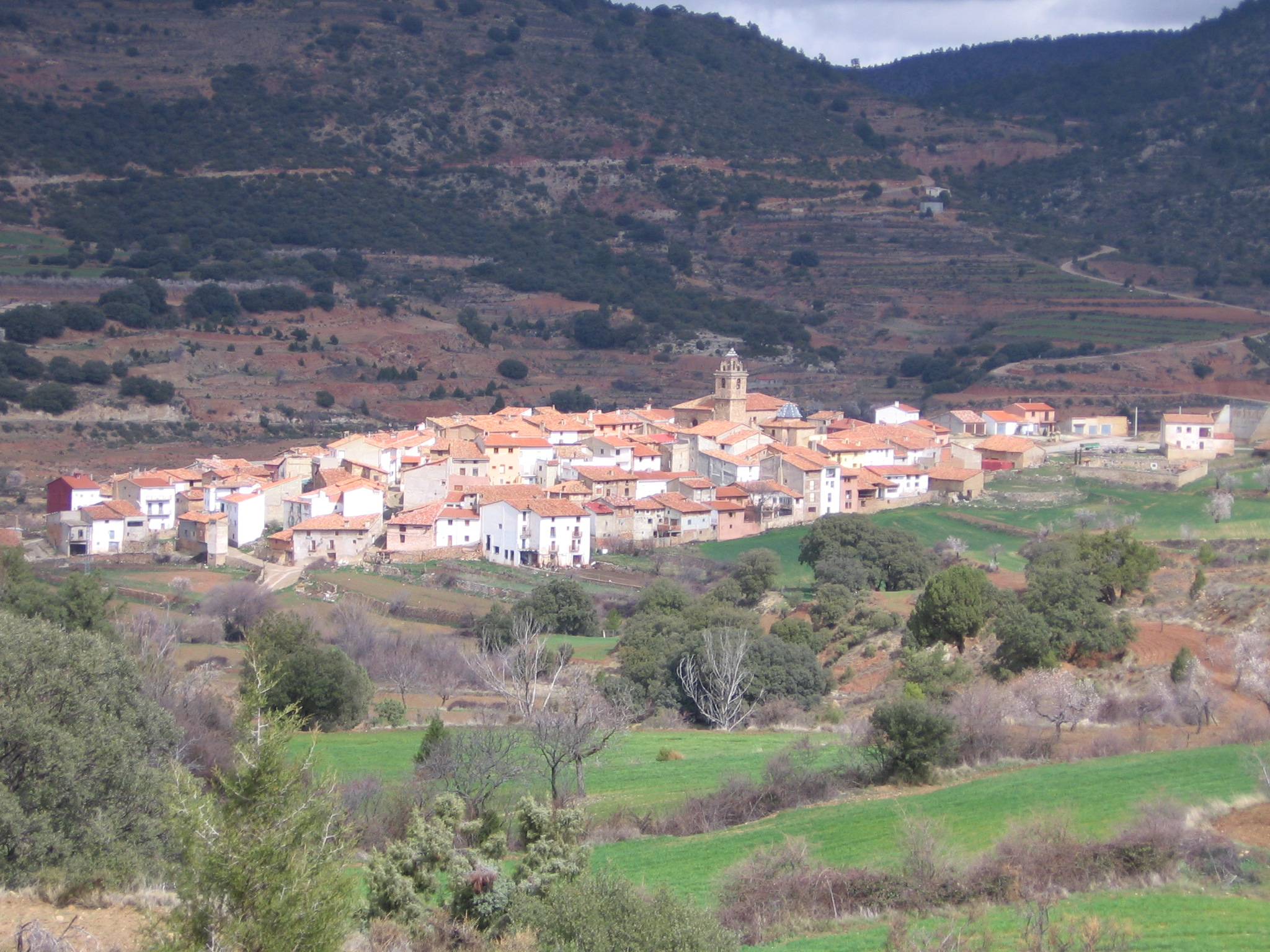

- Coat of arms

- Location in Spain Puebla de San Miguel (Spain)
- Coordinates: 40°2′43″N 1°8′40″W
- Country: Spain
- Autonomous community: Valencian Community
- Province: Valencia
- Comarca: Rincón de Ademuz
- Judicial district: Liria

Government
  - Alcalde: Eva María Azcutia Marqués

Area
  - Total: 63.6 km^{2} (24.6 sq mi)
- Elevation: 1,000 m (3,300 ft)

Population (2025-01-01)
  - Total: 53
  - Density: 0.83/km^{2} (2.2/sq mi)
- Demonym: Poblense
- Time zone: UTC+1 (CET)
  - Summer (DST): UTC+2 (CEST)
- Postal code: 46140
- Official language(s): Spanish
- Website: Official website

Puebla de San Miguel is a municipality in the comarca of Rincón de Ademuz in the Valencian Community, Spain.

== See also ==
- List of municipalities in Valencia
