= Casas Bajas =

- Municipality
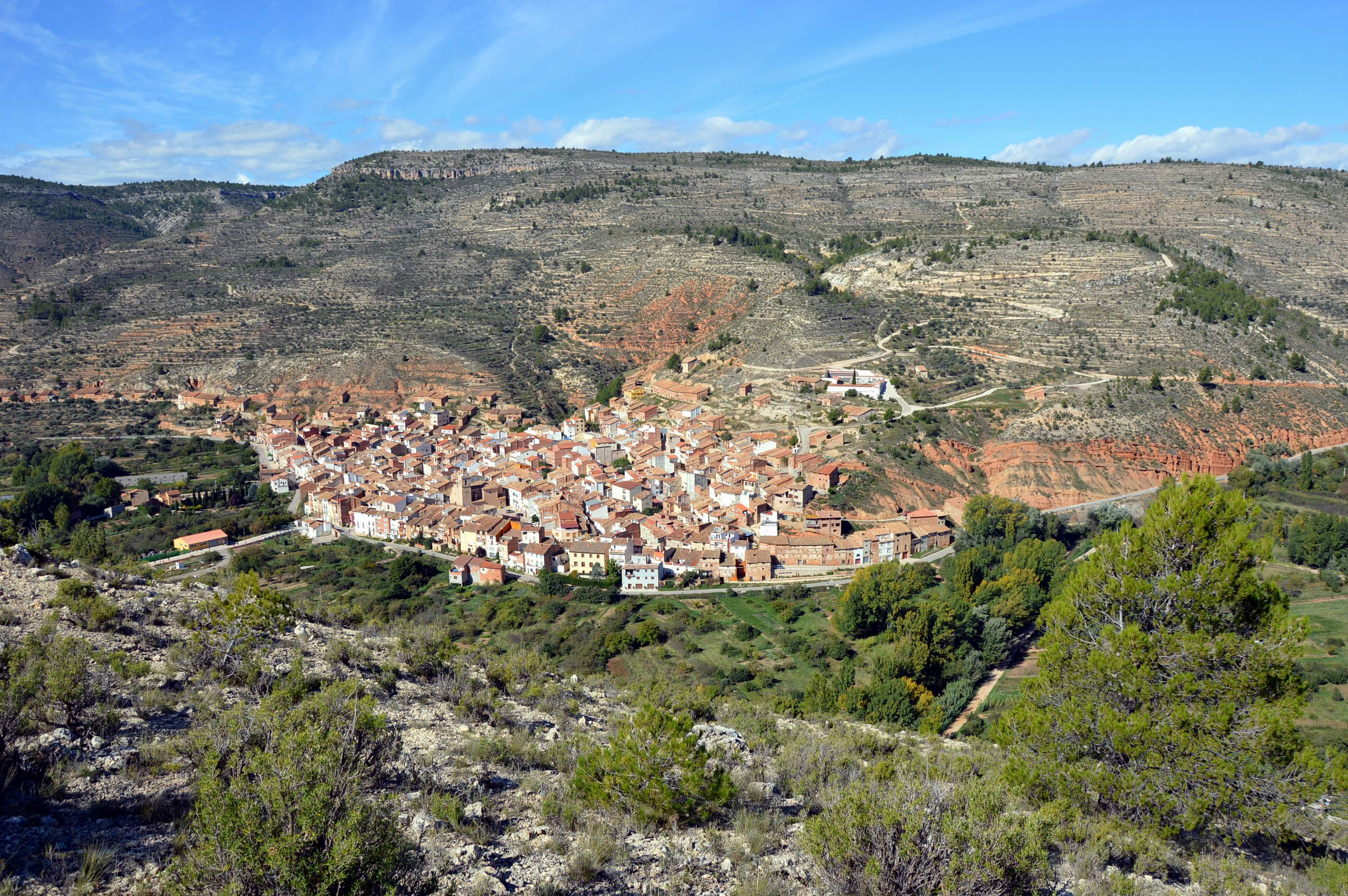
- General view

- Coat of arms

- Location in Spain Casas Bajas (Spain)
- Coordinates: 40°1′24″N 1°15′46″W
- Country: Spain
- Autonomous community: Valencian Community
- Province: Valencia
- Comarca: Rincón de Ademuz
- Judicial district: Liria

Government
  - Alcalde: Vicente Manuel Bes Aloy

Area
  - Total: 22.6 km^{2} (8.7 sq mi)
- Elevation: 650 m (2,130 ft)

Population (2025-01-01)
  - Total: 158
  - Density: 6.99/km^{2} (18.1/sq mi)
- Demonym(s): Casasbajero, casasbajera
- Time zone: UTC+1 (CET)
  - Summer (DST): UTC+2 (CEST)
- Postal code: 46146
- Official language(s): Spanish
- Website: Official website

Casas Bajas is a municipality in the comarca of Rincón de Ademuz in the Valencian Community, Spain.

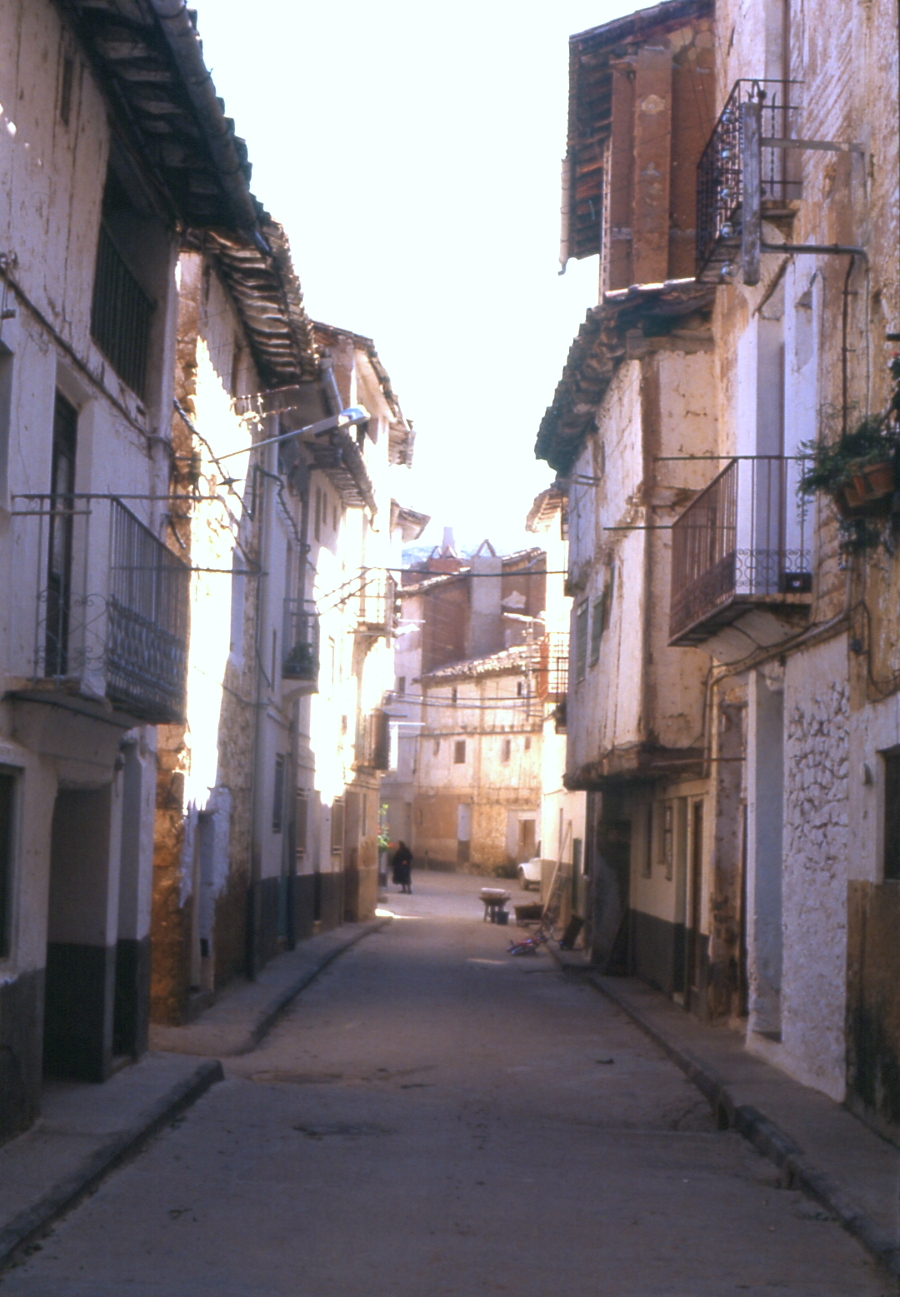
Casas Bajas, Calle del Paso in 1987

== See also ==
- List of municipalities in Valencia
