= Vallanca =

- Municipality
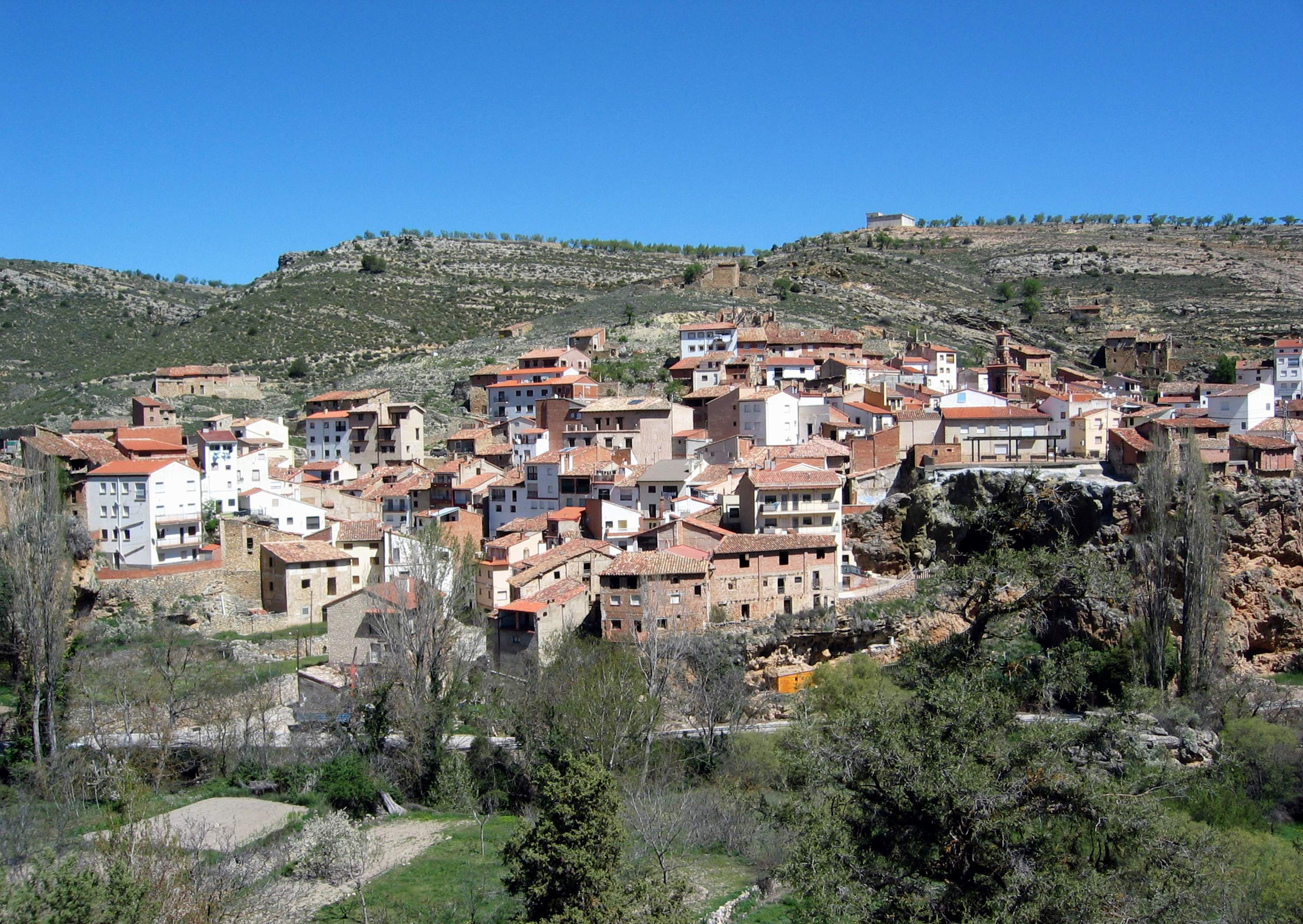

- Coat of arms

- Location in Spain Vallanca (Spain)
- Coordinates: 40°3′50″N 1°20′26″W
- Country: Spain
- Autonomous community: Valencian Community
- Province: Valencia
- Comarca: Rincón de Ademuz
- Judicial district: Liria
- Founded: 13th century

Government
  - Alcaldesa: Nuria Millán Eslava

Area
  - Total: 56.6 km^{2} (21.9 sq mi)
- Elevation: 950 m (3,120 ft)

Population (2025-01-01)
  - Total: 128
  - Density: 2.26/km^{2} (5.86/sq mi)
- Demonym(s): vallanquero, vallanquera
- Time zone: UTC+1 (CET)
  - Summer (DST): UTC+2 (CEST)
- Postal code: 46145
- Official language(s): Spanish
- Website: Official website

Vallanca is a municipality in the comarca of Rincón de Ademuz in the Valencian Community, Spain.

== See also ==
- List of municipalities in Valencia
