= Casas Altas =

- Municipality
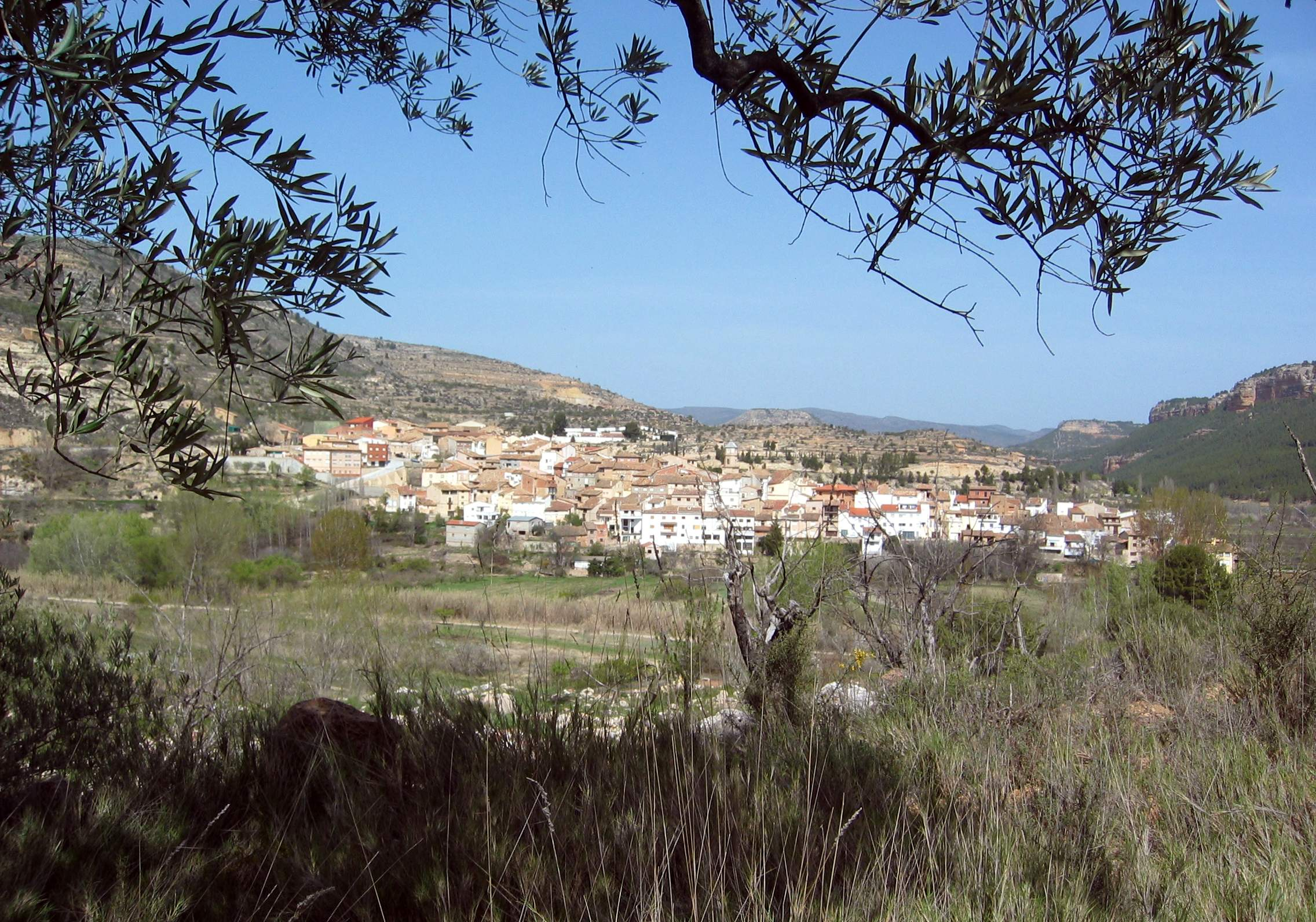
- General view

- Flag Coat of arms

- Location in Spain Casas Altas (Spain)
- Coordinates: 40°2′22″N 1°15′46″W
- Country: Spain
- Autonomous community: Valencian Community
- Province: Valencia
- Comarca: Rincón de Ademuz
- Judicial district: Liria

Government
  - Alcalde: Manuel Sánchez Sánchez

Area
  - Total: 15.9 km^{2} (6.1 sq mi)
- Elevation: 680 m (2,230 ft)

Population (2025-01-01)
  - Total: 118
  - Density: 7.42/km^{2} (19.2/sq mi)
- Demonym(s): Casasaltero, casasaltera
- Time zone: UTC+1 (CET)
  - Summer (DST): UTC+2 (CEST)
- Postal code: 46147
- Official language(s): Spanish
- Website: Official website

Casas Altas is a municipality in the comarca of Rincón de Ademuz in the Valencian Community, Spain.

== See also ==
- List of municipalities in Valencia
