= Torrebaja =

- Municipality
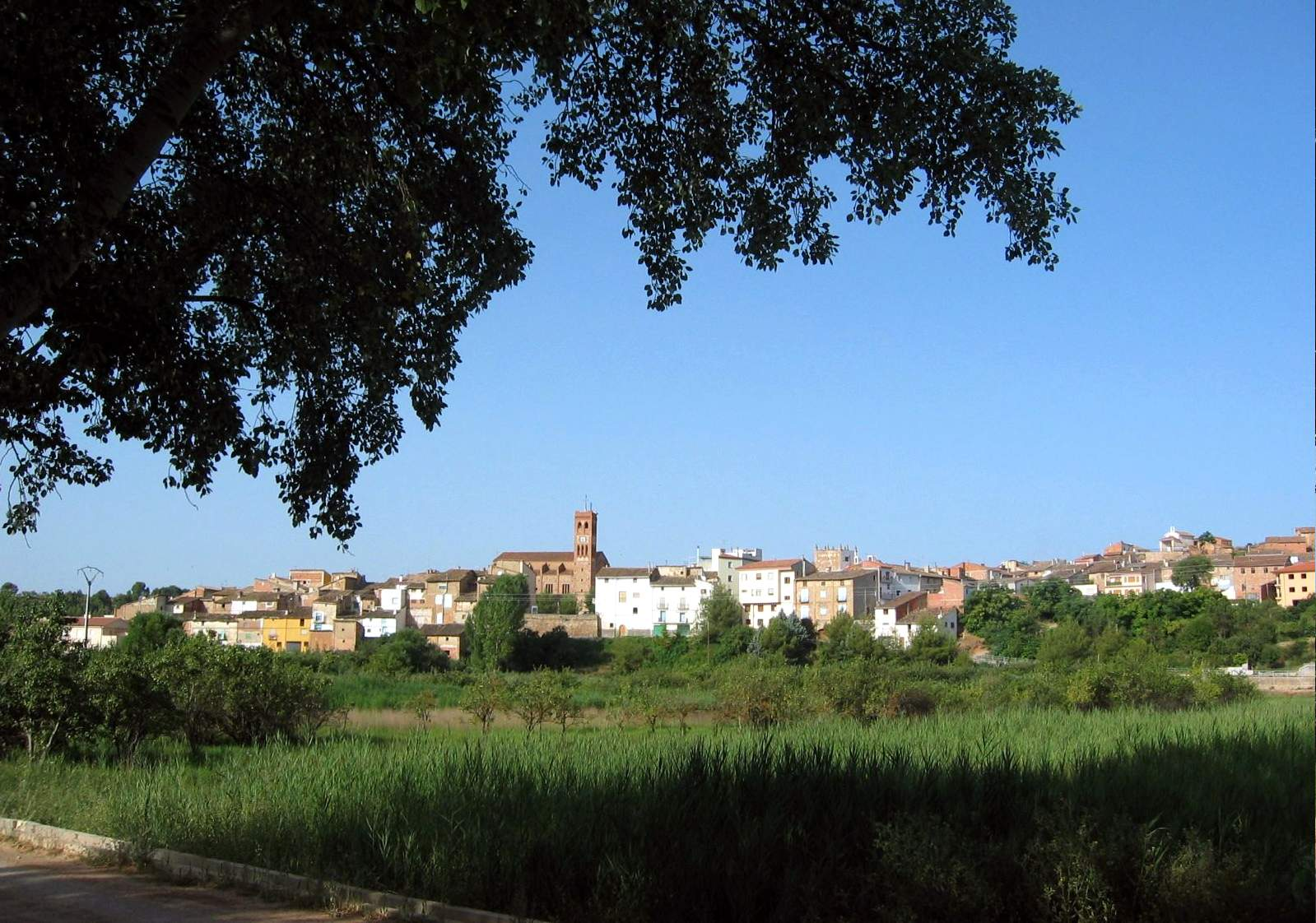

- Coat of arms

- Location in Spain Torrebaja (Spain)
- Coordinates: 40°5′44″N 1°15′26″W
- Country: Spain
- Autonomous community: Valencian Community
- Province: Valencia
- Comarca: Rincón de Ademuz
- Judicial district: Liria

Government
  - Alcalde: Francisco Javier Varela Tortajada

Area
  - Total: 4.7 km^{2} (1.8 sq mi)
- Elevation: 760 m (2,490 ft)

Population (2025-01-01)
  - Total: 398
  - Density: 85/km^{2} (220/sq mi)
- Time zone: UTC+1 (CET)
  - Summer (DST): UTC+2 (CEST)
- Postal code: 46143
- Official language(s): Spanish
- Website: Official website

Torrebaja is a municipality in the comarca of Rincón de Ademuz in the Valencian Community, Spain.

== See also ==
- List of municipalities in Valencia
