= Tormón =

Tormón, Spain
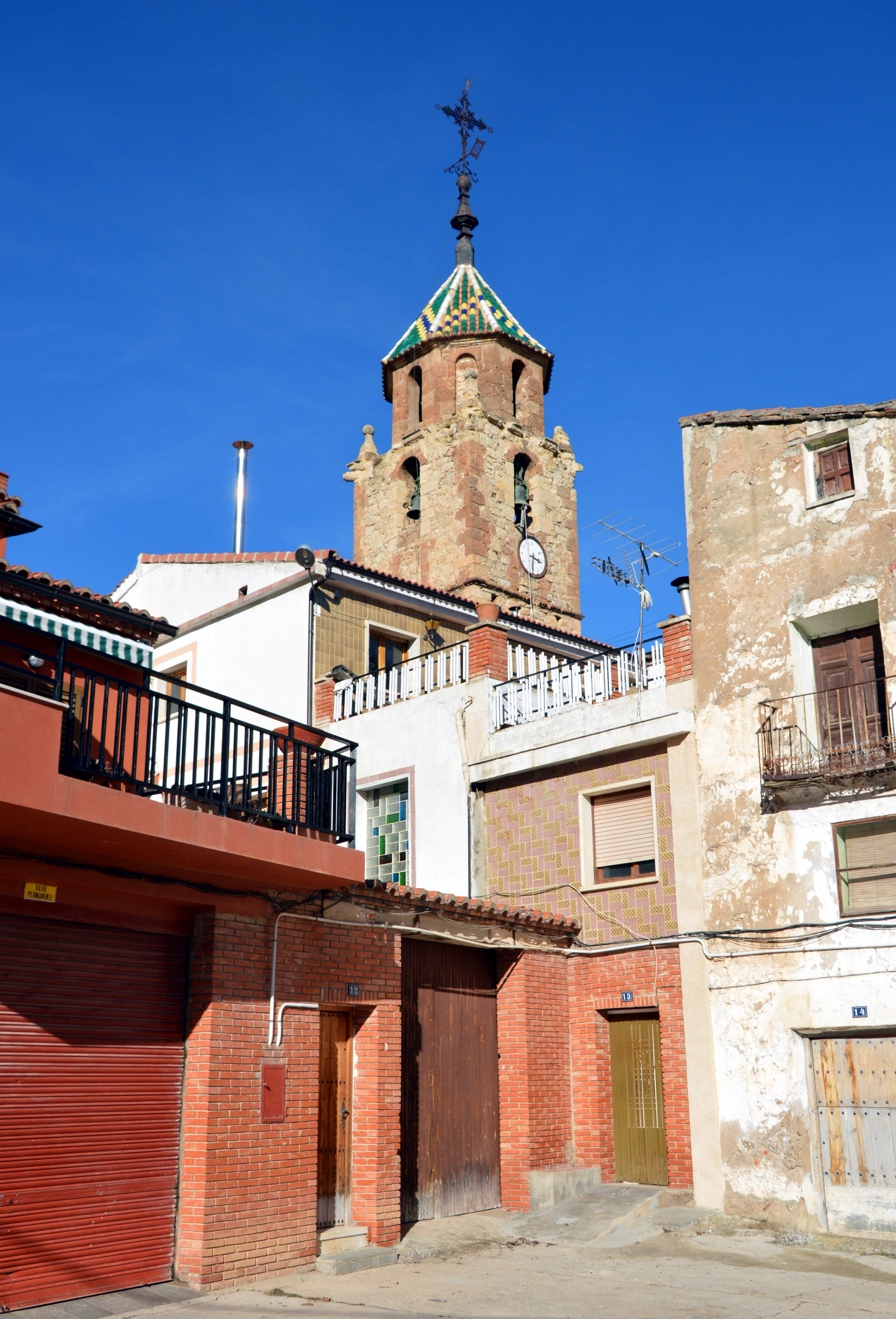

- Location within Spain
- Coordinates: 40°12′N 1°21′W
- Country: Spain
- Autonomous community: Aragon
- Province: Teruel
- Municipality: Tormón

Area
  - Total: 29 km^{2} (11 sq mi)

Population (2025-01-01)
  - Total: 29
  - Density: 1.0/km^{2} (2.6/sq mi)
- Time zone: UTC+1 (CET)
  - Summer (DST): UTC+2 (CEST)

Tormón is a municipality located in the province of Teruel, Aragon, Spain. According to the 2004 census (INE), the municipality has a population of 39 inhabitants.

== See also ==
- List of municipalities in Teruel
