= Rincón de Ademuz =

Coordinates: 40.0802°N 1.2854°W

Rincón de Ademuz Racó d'Ademús
- Comarca
- Coat of arms

- Country: Spain
- Autonomous community: Valencian Community
- Province: València / Valencia
- Capital and largest city: Ademuz
- Municipalities: 7 municipalities: Ademuz, Casas Altas, Casas Bajas, Castielfabib, Puebla de San Miguel, Torrebaja, Vallanca

Area
  - Total: 370.22 km^{2} (142.94 sq mi)

Population (2021 Census)
  - Total: 2,218
  - Density: 5.991/km^{2} (15.52/sq mi)
- Time zone: UTC+1 (CET)
  - Summer (DST): UTC+2 (CEST)

Rincón de Ademuz (Spanish: [riŋˈkon de aðeˈmuθ]; Valencian: Racó d'Ademús [raˈko ðaðeˈmus]) is a Spanish comarca constituted as an exclave of both the Valencian Community and the Valencia province located between the provinces of Cuenca (Castile-La Mancha) and Teruel (Aragon). It is part of the Spanish-speaking area in the Valencian Community.

== Geography ==
=== Overview ===
It is a largely rural and sparsely populated area with seven municipalities of which only its capital, Ademuz, has over 1,000 inhabitants.

The area has the river Turia as its major source of water.

=== Municipalities ===
Name	Population (2001)	Population (2011)	Population (2021)
Ademuz	1,115	1,250	1,033
Casas Altas	161	155	130
Casas Bajas	273	227	164
Castielfabib	302	301	294
Puebla de San Miguel	66	80	59
Torrebaja	423	447	403
Vallanca	213	161	135
Totals	2,553	2,621	2,218

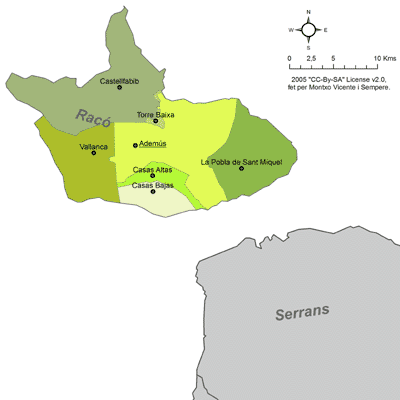
Map of municipalities of the Rincón de Ademuz

== Bibliography ==
- Eslava Blasco, R.: Castielfabib y su patrimonio histórico-artístico. Edición del Ayuntamiento de Castielfabib. 286 Pp. ISBN 978-84-606-4689-1. Castielfabib, 2014.
- Eslava Blasco, R.: Ademuz y su patrimonio histórico-artístico. Ademuz, 2007.
- Eslava Blasco, R.: Vallanca y su patrimonio histórico-artístico religioso. Vallanca, 2006.
- Gargallo Gil, J.E.: Habla y cultura popular en el Rincón de Ademuz. Madrid, 2004.
- Rodrigo Alfonso, C.: El Rincón de Ademuz, análisis comarcal. Valencia, 1998.
- ABABOL. Revista del Instituto Cultural y de Estudios del Rincón de Ademuz (ICERA), dirigida per Ángel Antón Andrés i publicada trimestralment an Ademús des de 1995.
