= Rapa das Bestas of Sabucedo =

Roundup of wild horses in Spain

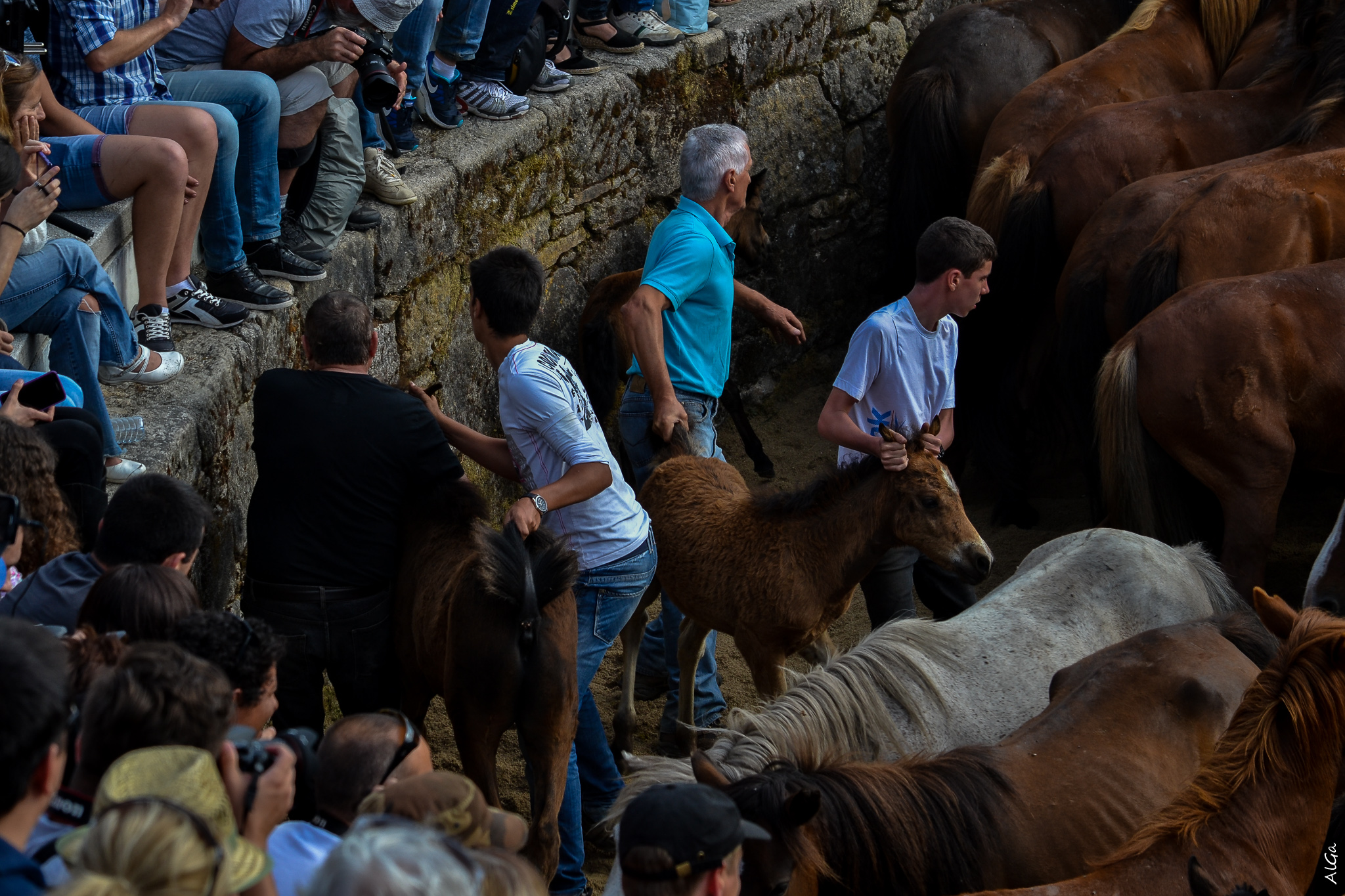
- Rapa das bestas 2015
- Dates: First Friday, Saturday, Sunday and Monday of July
- Frequency: Annual
- Locations: Sabucedo, A Estrada (Pontevedra), Spain

Fiesta of International Tourist Interest
- Designated: 2007

A rapa das bestas is the name given to the annual curro (roundup) of wild horses celebrated the first Friday, Saturday, Sunday and Monday of July in Sabucedo, A Estrada (Pontevedra), Spain.

Across more than 200 km^{2} of hillside currently more than six-hundred horses roam freely in fourteen droves, referred to in Galician as bestas (mares) and garañones (stallions). The festival involves bringing the horses down from the hillside, gathering them into an enclosure, cutting their manes and tails, and tagging them, nowadays with a microchip. The curro in Sabucedo is the most renowned of all and is set apart from the rest by unique characteristics, the most important of which is that neither ropes, sticks, nor other such instruments are used to subdue the animals. The aloitadores, those responsible for restraining the horses whilst the rapa takes place, use only their body strength and raw skill to complete the job. Another interesting feature of the rapa is the Bajada– the process of rounding up the horses and leading them into Sabucedo – a part of the celebration joined by hundreds of local residents and visitors from further afield. Another element of the tradition is the celebration of a poignant mass, held very early on the Saturday morning, before going up the hill. During the mass, the congregation pray to San Lorenzo, the patron saint of Sabucedo, to keep those participating from any harm.

According to the scholar Manuel Cabada, the rapa is a rite of passage from childhood to adolescence for those who seize a foal for the first time, guided and assisted by the older generation. The town of A Estrada is twinned with Almonte, located in the province of Huelva, due to a similar celebration that takes place called Saca de las Yeguas.

== History ==
Records show that the tradition of the bajada, the subsequent rapa and the marking of the young foals dates back to the beginning of the 18th century. Nevertheless, it is believed that the tradition is actually much older as scholars such as Manuel Cabada have mentioned in their writings. In fact it could even be Pre-Roman, given that various petroglyphs have been found in the area in which men are depicted on horseback. In 1963, the festival was declared of National Touristic Interest, and in 2007 was awarded the status of International Touristic Interest.

== See also ==
- Rapa das Bestas
