= Holy Week in Segovia =

Catholic cultural event in Segovia

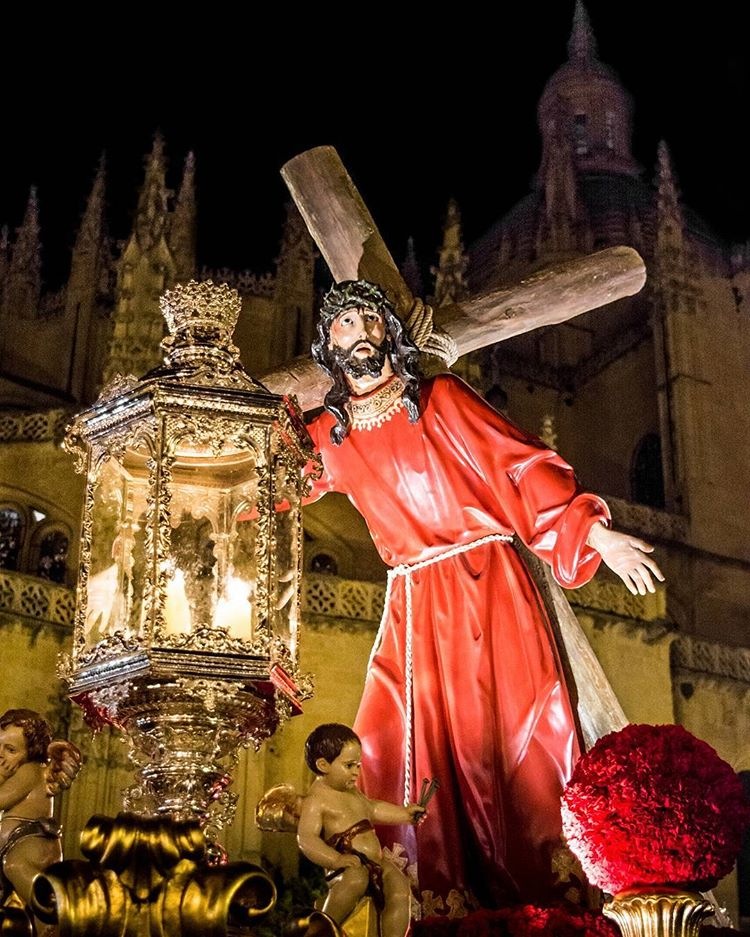
- Official name: Semana Santa de Segovia
- Observed by: Segovia, Spain
- Type: Religious, historical, cultural
- Significance: Conmemoration of the passion, death and resurrection of Jesus
- Celebrations: Processions
- Begins: Palm Sunday
- Ends: Easter Sunday
- Date: Variable
- Duration: 1 week
- Frequency: Annual

The Holy Week in Segovia (Spanish: Semana Santa de Segovia) is one of the biggest religious and cultural festivities in the city, as well as a main tourist interest. During the week, 10 brotherhoods march through the city with a total of 17 pasos (or floats) with the polychrome carvings and statues of authors such as Gregorio Fernandez and Aniceto Marinas. Holy Week in Segovia was proclaimed a Fiesta of National Tourist Interest in 2017

== History ==
=== First brotherhoods ===
The earliest evidence of a Holy Week celebration in Segovia dates back to 1534, the year in which the functioning of the confraternities was regulated by means of a Royal pragmatic.The first brotherhoods were of a disciplinary nature, these being divided into two: those that processed on Maundy Thursday (Cofradía de las Cinco Llagas) and those that processed on Good Friday (Cofradía del Confalón y la Esclavitud de Nuestra Señora de la Soledad y Santo Sepulcro).

==== Cofradía de las Cinco Llagas (Brotherhood of the Five Wounds) ====
The first mention of the brotherhood dates back to 29 March 1596, it is known that it had its headquarters in the monastery of Saint Francis, located in what is now the Artillery Academy, Cristóbal Núñez describes it as 'very old' and 'very important in the city'. Most of the members of the brotherhood were either segovians or residents of the village of Zamarramala, which marched during Holy Thursday. In 1597 the Cofradía de la Santa Cruz de Zamarramala separated from the Cofradía de las Cinco Llagas due to the fact that some of the brotherhood members living in Zamarramala had died from the wounds caused by their penitential punishments when they tried to return to their homes.

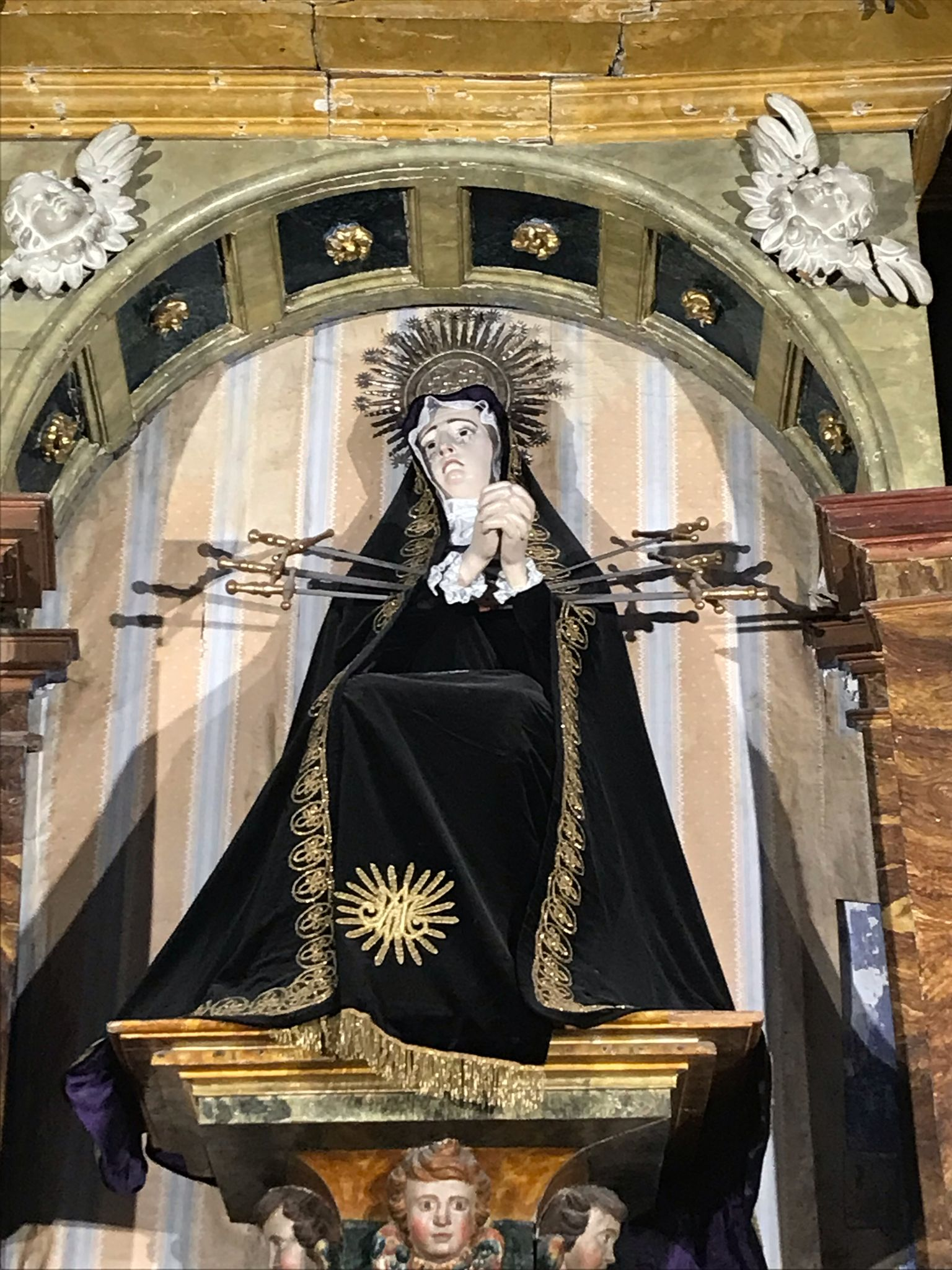
"Nuestra Señora de las Anguistas", currently ubicated in the Church of San Miguel

==== Cofradía del Confalón y la Esclavitud de Nuestra Señora de la Soledad y Santo Sepulcro (Brotherhood of the Gonfalon and the Slavery of Our Lady of Solitude and the Holy Sepulchre) ====
The Cofradía del Confalón was founded on 1 January 1572, it had its headquarters in the monastery of La Merced, located in what is now the Plaza de la Merced, and marched with the float of Nuestra Señora de las Angustias on Holy Friday

The brotherhood Esclavitud de Nuestra Señora de la Soledad y Santo Sepulcro is first mentioned the 28th of july of 1952, its headquarters were located at the monastery of John of God. The members of the brotherhood had the obligation of taking care of the sick residents in the Hospital de Desamparados. On 24 January 1592, the confraternity was twinned with the confraternity of Confalon and on 6 January 1648, the confraternity was re-founded.

=== 17th, 18th and 19th centuries ===
==== Esclavitud del Vía Crucis (Slavery of the Stations of the Cross) ====
The Esclavitud del Vía Crucis was a brotherhood founded in 1693 in the chapel of San Roque, its by-laws were signed on 29th March 1696. The task of the brotherhood was to stage the Stations of the Cross, specifically the Descent from the Cross, in the chapel of La Piedad. In 1756 the brotherhood signed an agreement with the guild of tailors..

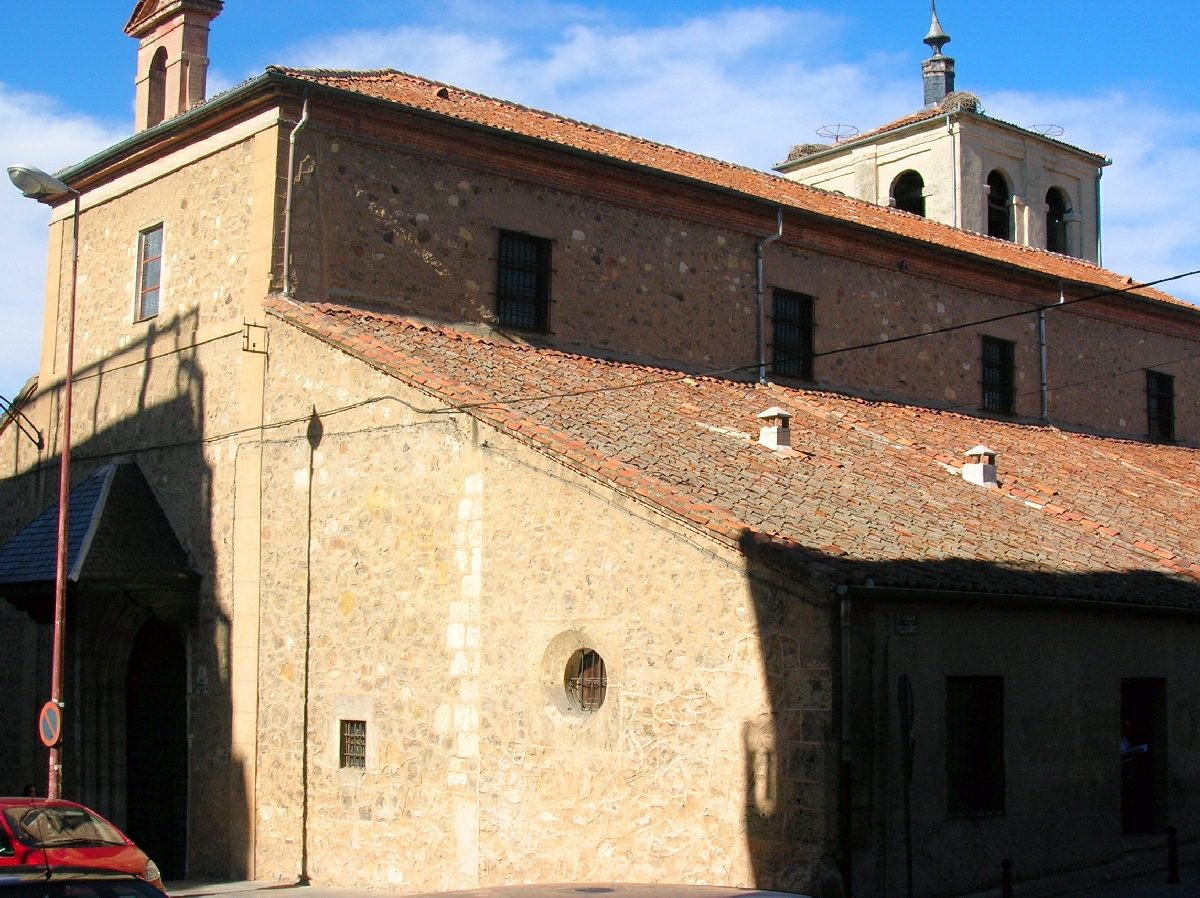
Church of Saint Eulalia nowadays

==== Sermón de las Siete Palabras and first Procesión de los Pasos ====
The Sermón de las Siete Palabras (Sermon of the Seven Words) was a speech given between 1880 and 1888 in the neighbourhood of Saint Eulalia. Its name comes from the seven words Jesus said while being crucified.

There are records of the existence of a procession of several floats from different guilds. This procession started from the church of Santa Eulalia on Holy Thursday and was organised by the guild of 'apartadores' (People in charge of sorting wool depending on its quality), which has now disappeared. A total of five images belonging to different guilds took part in the procession, which is considered to be the primitive version of the actual Procesión de los Pasos

=== 20th century ===
==== Reorganisation of the Procesión de los Pasos ====
In 1905, Julián Miranda Bistuer was appointed bishop of Segovia. A year later, in 1906, he commissioned a series of processional floats, originally from the Catalan school of sculptors, which he planned to distribute to the various guilds in the city. Finally, between 10 and 20 March 1907, the seven processional floats were delivered to their respective guilds, these being:

- 'Oración en el Huerto’ (The Agony in the Garden) received by the guild of market gardeners and farmers.
- 'Jesus azotado por sayones' ( The Scourging at the Pillar) received by the guild of masons, carpenters, stonemasons and painters.
- ‘Ecce Homo’ given to the guild of tinsmiths, wheelwrights, silversmiths, forgers and smokers.
- ‘Jesus Nazareno’ given to the guild of shoemakers, tanners and shoe warehousemen.
- ‘María Magdalena junto a Jesús crucificado’ (Mary Magdalene next to crucified Jesus) received by the guild of bakers, millers, cologne warehousemen, grocers and printers.
- ‘Soledad de María’ (Solitude of Mary) received by the tailors' guild.
- ‘María santísima al pie de la cruz teniendo en su maternal regazo el cuerpo frio y ensangrentado de su Hijo’ (Mary most holy at the foot of the Cross holding in her maternal lap the cold and bloodied body of her Son) received by the students of the Conciliar Seminary.

On 24 March 1907, Palm Sunday, the first Procesión de los Pasos was held. On 17 March 1911 it was decided to change the date from Palm Sunday to Maundy Thursday, and the procession was cancelled on two occasions: during the Civil War and between 1974 and 1977. In 1980 the Junta de Cofradías de Segovia was founded. As the years went by, several brotherhoods were added, such as the Cofradía del Cristo de los Gascones, Cofradía de San Millan, Cofradía del Cristo del Mercado and Cofradía de San José.

==== Palm Sunday procession and 'El Encuentro' ====
In the 19th century, the Palm Sunday procession was carried out by the Cofradía del Confalón, and on 8 April 1964, the current carving of the 'Entry into Jerusalem', made by José María Moro, was presented.

The procession of 'El Encuentro' (the meeting between Mary and Jesus after His resurrection on Holy Sunday) was resumed in 2004 with the carving of "Risen Christ" from the church of San Millan, the Cofradía de la Virgen del Rocío was founded on 20 June 2008, it goes out in procession with the carving of the Virgen del Rocío, since 2012.

== Processions ==
| Día | Procesiones |
|---|---|
| Friday before the Fifth Sunday in Lent | Vía Crucis in the neighbourhood of San Lorenzo |
| Saturday before the Fifth Sunday of Lent | Announcement of the speech on horseback with members of all the brotherhoods of Segovia from the Church of San Millán to the Plaza Mayor.; Speech at the Cathedral of Segovia |
| Fifth Sunday in Lent | Inaugural Concert of the Segovian Holy Week with the participation of the Bands that accompany the different brotherhoods |
| Wednesday before Palm Sunday | Vía Crucis in the Cristo del Mercado neighbourhood |
| Friday of Sorrows | Procession of the Three Falls; Procession with 'Nuestra Madre María Santísima de las Angustias' and prayer of Via Matris; Staged Stations of the Cross of the Passion |
| Passion Saturday | Procession of the 'Cristo de la Buena Muerte' |
| Palm Sunday | Liturgical Procession of the Palms ‘La Borriquilla’.; Procession between the churches Santo Tomás and Santa Eulalia through the Botanical Garden with the carvings of 'Christ tied to the Column' and 'The Soledad'. |
| Holy Monday | Procession with the 'Santo Cristo de la Salud' |
| Holy Tuesday | Procession of The Passion Of Jesus in the Children; Procession and Prayer of the Five Mysteries with the 'Santo Cristo de la Esperanza' |
| Holy Wednesday | Procession of 'Nuestro Padre Jesús Cautivo'; Procession of the 'Cristo de la Paciencia'; Via Crucis with 'Santo Cristo de la Buena Muerte' in the orchard of the Carmelite Fathers; Performance of 'El Silencio del Tambor' in the church of San Marcos |
| Holy Thursday | Procession of 'La Flagelación del Señor'; Procession of 'Nuestra Señora la Soledad al Pie de la Cruz' and 'Santísimo Cristo en su última Palabra'; Procession of 'Nuestra Señora de la Soledad Dolorosa'; Procession of 'El Calvario', 'La Magdalena al Pie de la Cruz' and 'Nuestra Señora de la Piedad'; Procession of 'Santo Cristo del Mercado'; Procession of 'Jesús con la Cruz a Cuestas' y 'La Virgen de las Angustias'; Procession of 'La Oración en el Huerto'; Vía Crucis with the carvings of 'Santo Cristo de Los Gascones' and 'Virgen de los Sastres' |
| Holy Friday | Procession of 'Santo Cristo de los Gascones'; Procession of ' Santo Cristo de San Marcos'; Stations of the Cross with the carving of 'Jesús Nazareno' of the Church of San Clemente, from the Church of San Millán to the Altos de la Piedad; Parade of Bugle and Drum Bands from the Aqueduct to the Cathedral; Procesión de los Pasos, with the participation of the images: 'La Oración en el Huerto; 'La Flagelación del Señor'; 'Nuestro Señor Jesús con la Cruz a Cuestas'; 'María Santisima de las Angustias'; 'Santo Cristo de la Cruz' (also known as 'Cristo del Mercado'); 'Santo Cristo de San Marcos'; 'Santo Cristo en su Última Palabra'; 'Soledad al Pie de la Cruz'; 'El Calvario'; 'María Magdalena al Pie de la Cruz'; 'Nuestra Señora de la Piedad'; 'Santo Cristo de los Gascones'; 'Cristo Yacente'; 'La Soledad Dolorosa'; Procession of the Holy Burial from Zamarramala to the Church of the Vera Cruz with the Templars of the Order of Malta and the images of 'Cristo Crucificado', 'Virgen Dolorosa' and 'Cristo Yacente' |
| Holy Saturday | No processions are held in Segovia on Holy Saturday. |
| Holy Sunday | Procession of 'El Encuentro'b with the images of 'Cristo Resucitado' and 'Virgen del Rocio'; Return procession of 'Virgen Del Rocío; Tribute to the sculptor Aniceto Marinas |

== Brotherhoods ==
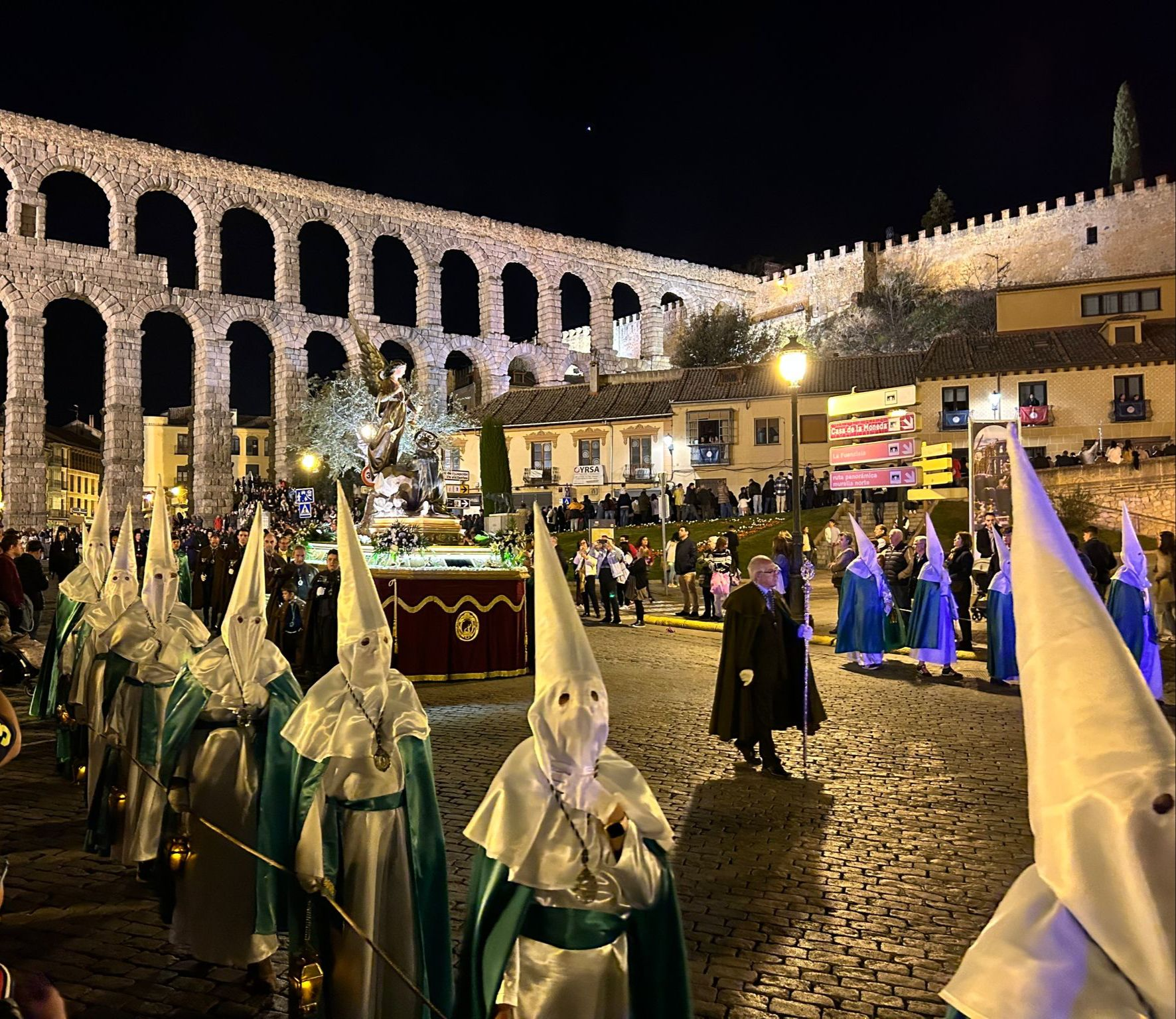
Procession of the Cofradía de la Oración en el Huerto

=== Cofradía de la Oración en el Huerto (Brotherhood of the Agony in the Garden) ===
The brotherhood was founded in 1978 and is based in the Church of San Lorenzo. It carries the float of 'La Oración en el Huerto' (The Agony in the Garden), made in 1907 by Josep Rius. They wear a white habit and capirote, together with a green cincture and cape. It is accompanied by the band, 'Banda de Cornetas y Tambores Félix Martín'.

=== Cofradía de la Flagelación del Señor (Brotherhood of the Flagellation of the Lord) ===
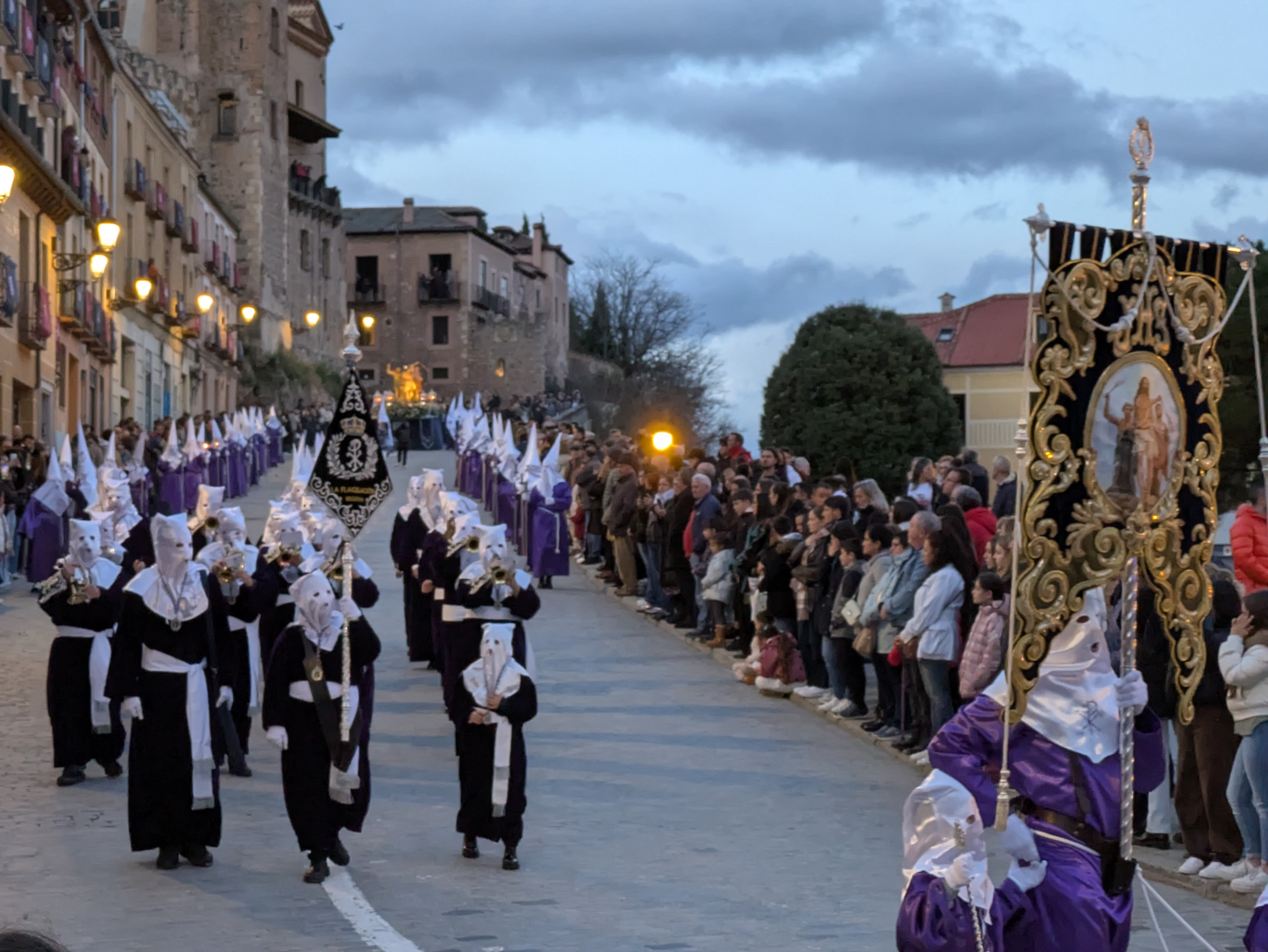
Processión of the Cofradía de la Flagelación del Señor

The Brotherhood was founded in 1988 and is based in the Parish Church of La Resurrección del Señor. It carries the float 'La Flagelación del Señor' and 'Nuestra Madre Dolorosa' (The Flagellation of the Lord and Our Sorrowful Mother), made by José Quixal in 1907 and Rafael Martín Hernandez in 2020, respectively . It wears a purple habit and white cincture and capirote. It is accompanied by the brotherhood's titular band of bugles and drums.

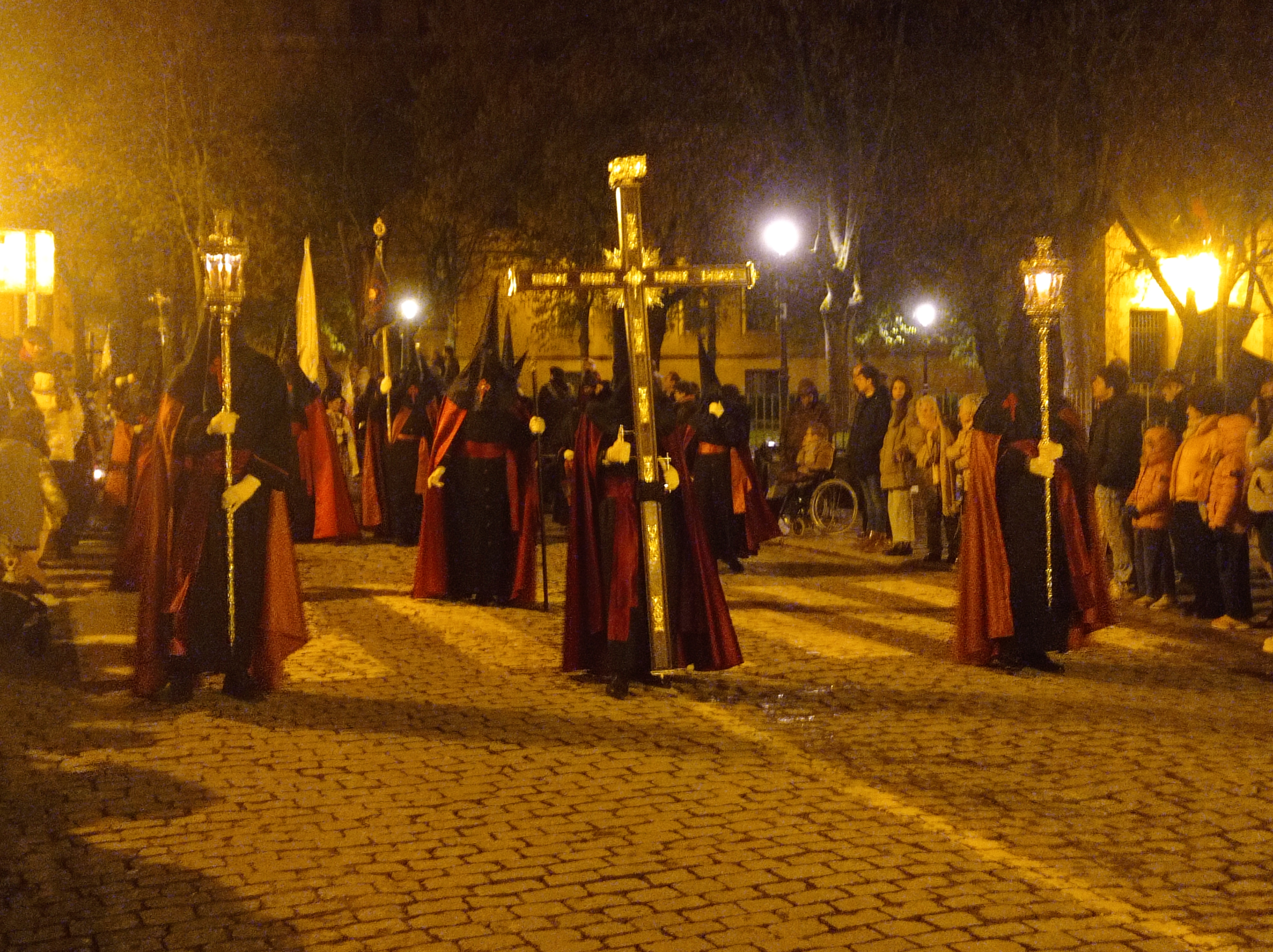
Procession of the A.D.E.MAR

=== Cofradía Penitencial de Nuestro Señor Jesús con la Cruz a Cuestas y María Santísima de las Angustias de la Asociación de Exalumnos Maristas (A.D.E.MAR) (Penitential Confraternity of Our Lord Jesus Carrying the Cross and Mary Most Holy of Sorrows of the Marist Alumni Association) ===
This brotherhood, founded in 1959, carries the floats of 'Santo Cristo con la Cruz a Cuestas' (Holy Christ Carrying the Cross) and 'María Santísima de las Angustias' (Mary Most Holy of Sorrows), the latter attributed to the workshop of Juan de Juni at the end of the 16th century. They wear a black habit and capirote, together with a maroon cincture and cape. It is accompanied by the brotherhood's titular band of dulzainas and drums.

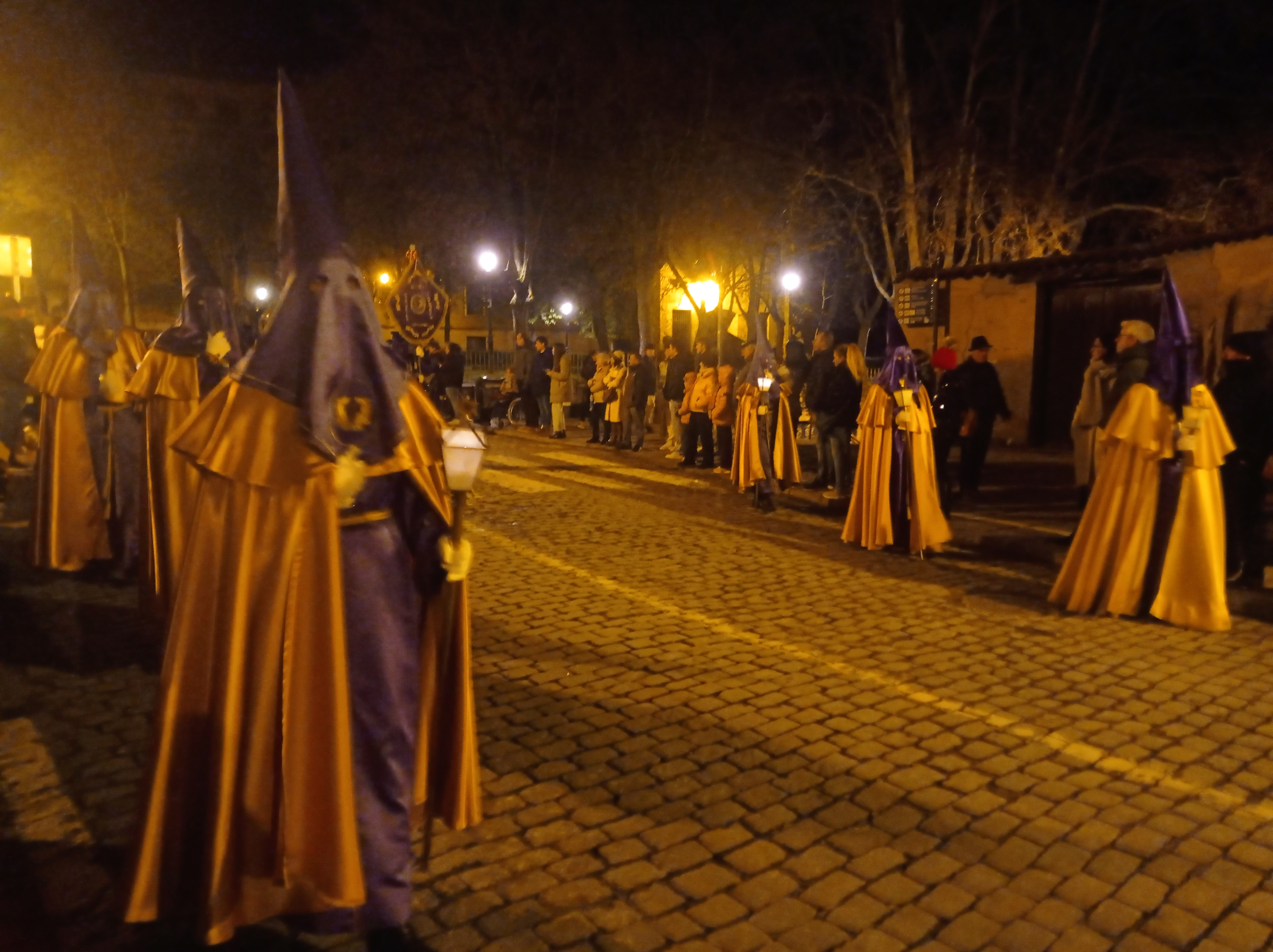
Procession of the Cofradía de la Esclavitud del Santo Cristo de la Cruz

=== Cofradía de la Esclavitud del Santo Cristo de la Cruz (Brotherhood of the Slavery of the Holy Christ of the Cross) ===
Brotherhood founded at the end of the 17th century and based in the Ermita de la Cruz, it carries the float of 'Santo Cristo de la Cruz' (Holy Christ of the Cross) by an anonymous author. They wear a habit with golden buttons and a purple hood, together with a cape and a golden yellow sash. It is accompanied by the 'Banda de dulzainas y tambores de la Cofradía de la Esclavitud del Santo Cristo de la Cruz' and by members of the Guardia Civil of Segovia.

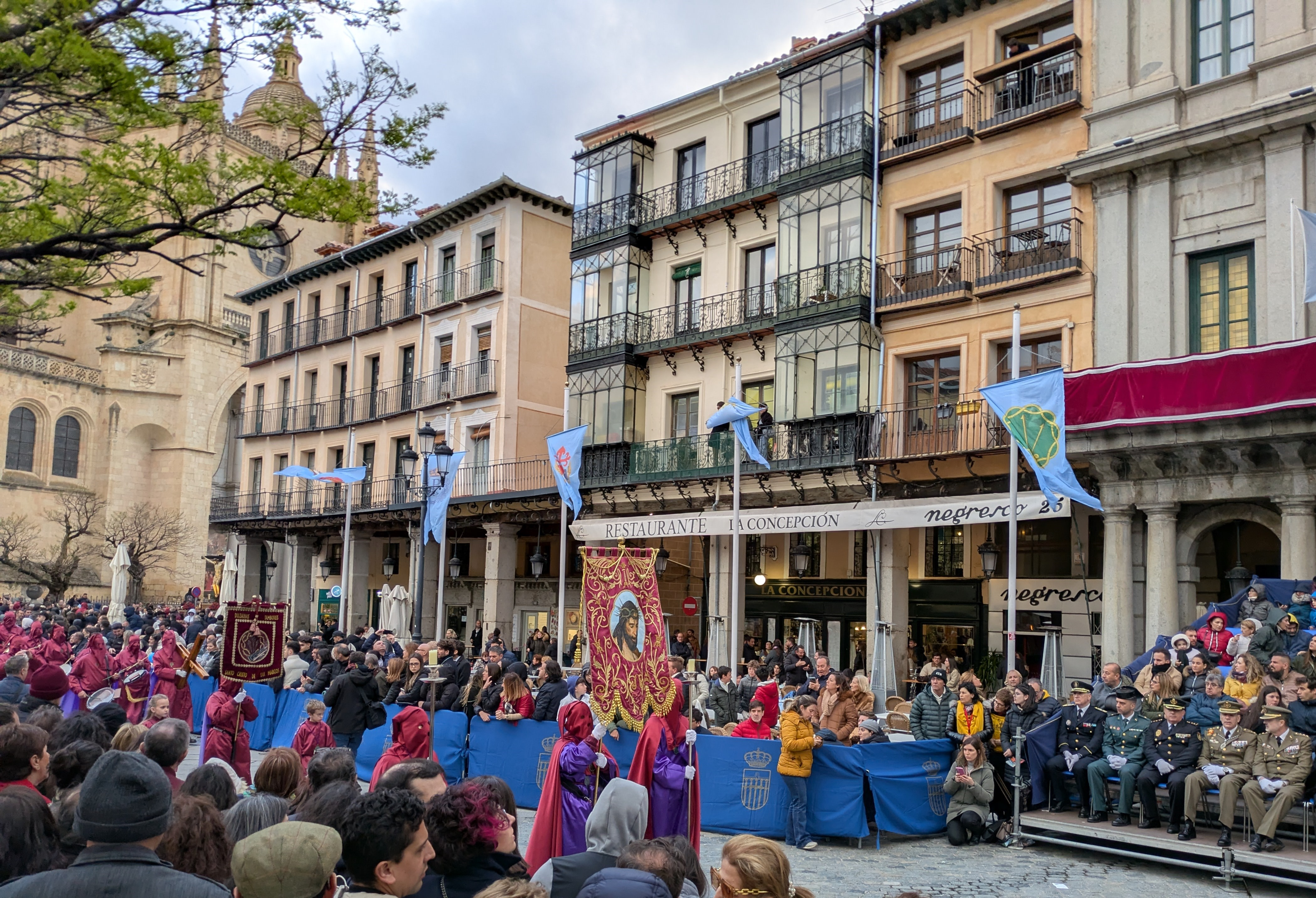
Procession of the Cofradía del Cristo de San Marcos

=== Cofradía del Santo Cristo de San Marcos (Brotherhood of the Holy Christ of Saint Mark) ===
The brotherhood was founded in 1966 and based in the Church of San Marcos, it carries the float of 'Santo Cristo de San Marcos' (Holy Christ of Saint Mark), by an anonymous author. They wear a purple habit, together with a maroon cap and cincture. They are accompanied by the 'Banda de dulzainas, tambores y carraca de la Cofradía del Santo Cristo de san Marcos'.

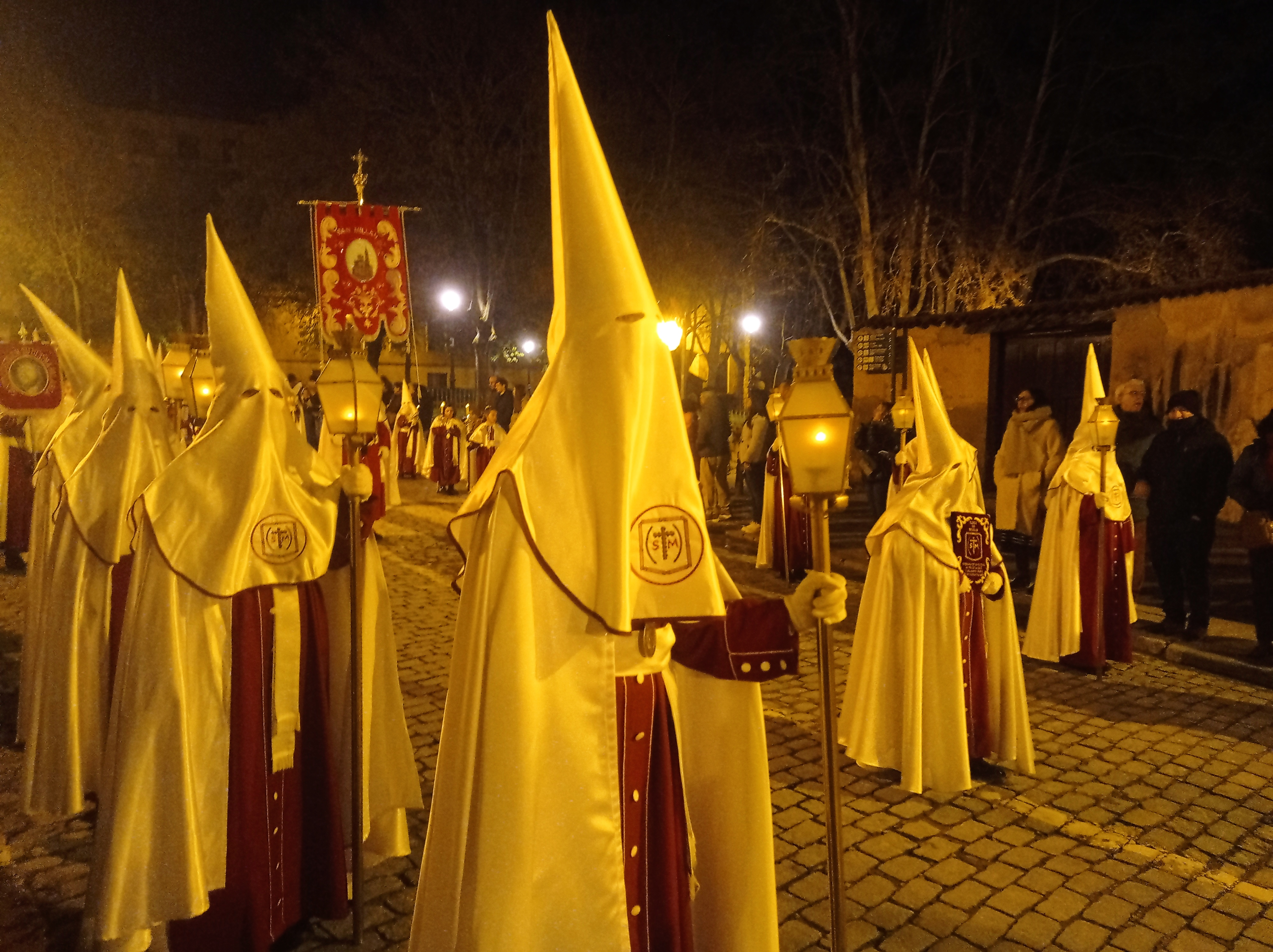
Procession of the Cofradía de San Millán

=== Cofradía de la Soledad al Pie de la Cruz y del Santo Cristo en su Última Palabra (Brotherhood of the Solitude at the Foot of the Cross and of the Holy Christ in His Last Word) ===
The brotherhood was founded in 1930 and is based in the Church of San Millán. It carries the floats of ‘Nuestra Señora de la Soledad al Pie de la Cruz’ and ‘Santo Cristo en su Última Palabra’ (Our Lady of Solitude at the Foot of the Cross and Holy Christ at His Last Word), both made by the Segovian sculptor Aniceto Marinas in 1930 and 1947 respectively. They wear white capirotes, cincture and cape, together with a maroon habit. They are accompanied by the Banda de cornetas y tambores de la Cofradía de la Soledad al Pie de la Cruz y el Santo Cristo en su Última Palabra.

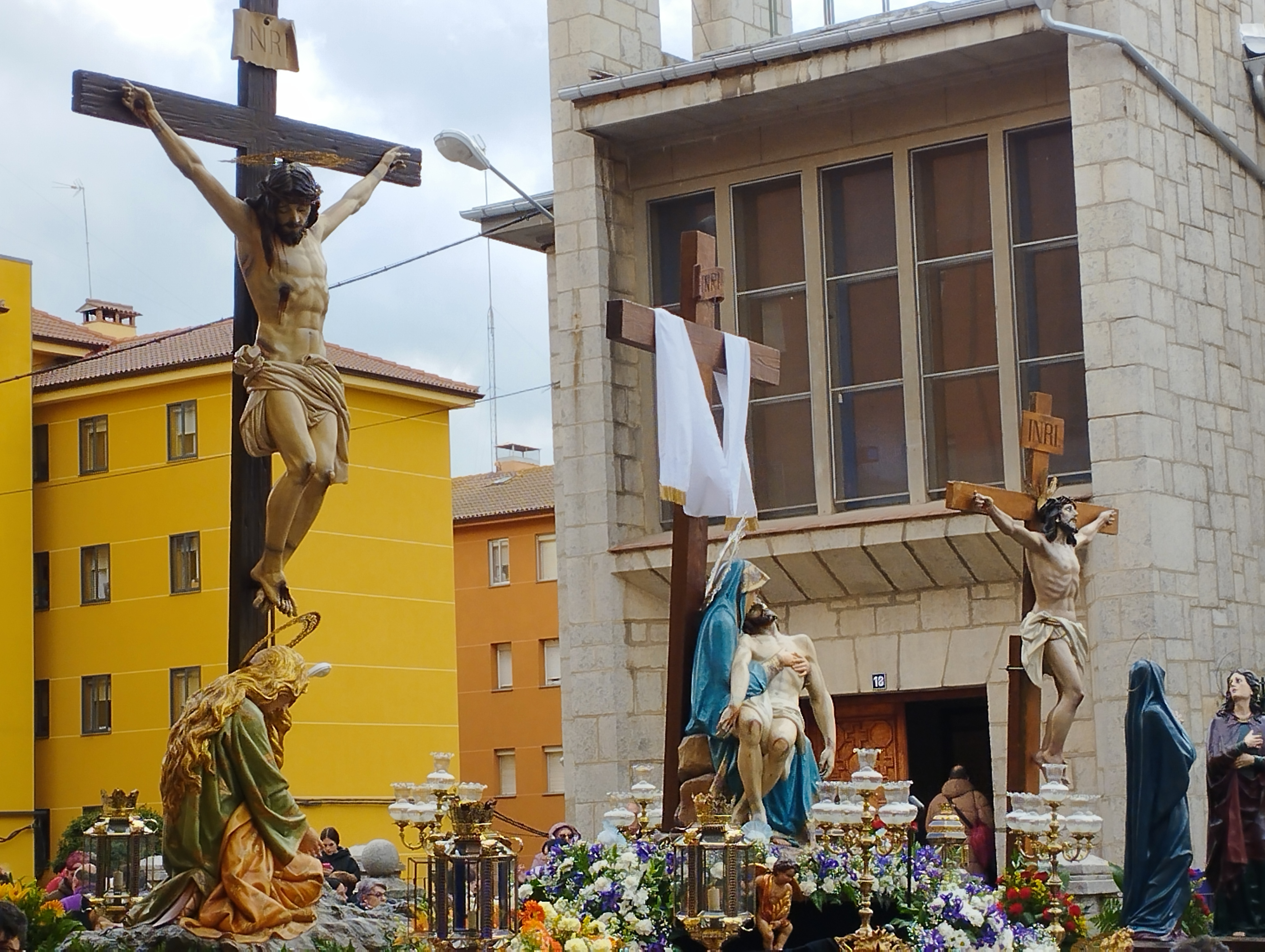
Procession of the Cofradía Nuestra Señora de la Piedad

=== Cofradía de Nuestra Señora de la Piedad (Brotherhood of Our Lady of Mercy) ===
The brotherhood was founded in 1990 and has its headquarters in the Church of San José. The procession carries the floats ‘Nuestra Señora de la Piedad', 'Nuestra Señora de la Magdalena al Pie de la Cruz', 'El Calvario’ and 'Nuestro Padre Jesús Cautivo', (Our Lady of Mercy, Our Lady of the Magdalene at the Feet of the Cross, The Calvary and Our Father Jesus in Captivity), the first two floats being the work of Sebastián Sanabra and José Quixal, the sculptural group El Calvario is the work of the School of Olot and 'Nuestro Padre Jesús Cautivo being the newest of the sculptures, having been made in 2015 by Juan Manuel Montaño Fernandez. They wear a purple habit and capirote, together with a cape and white cord. They are accompanied by the 'Banda de cornetas y tambores de la Cofradía Nuestra Señora de la Piedad'.

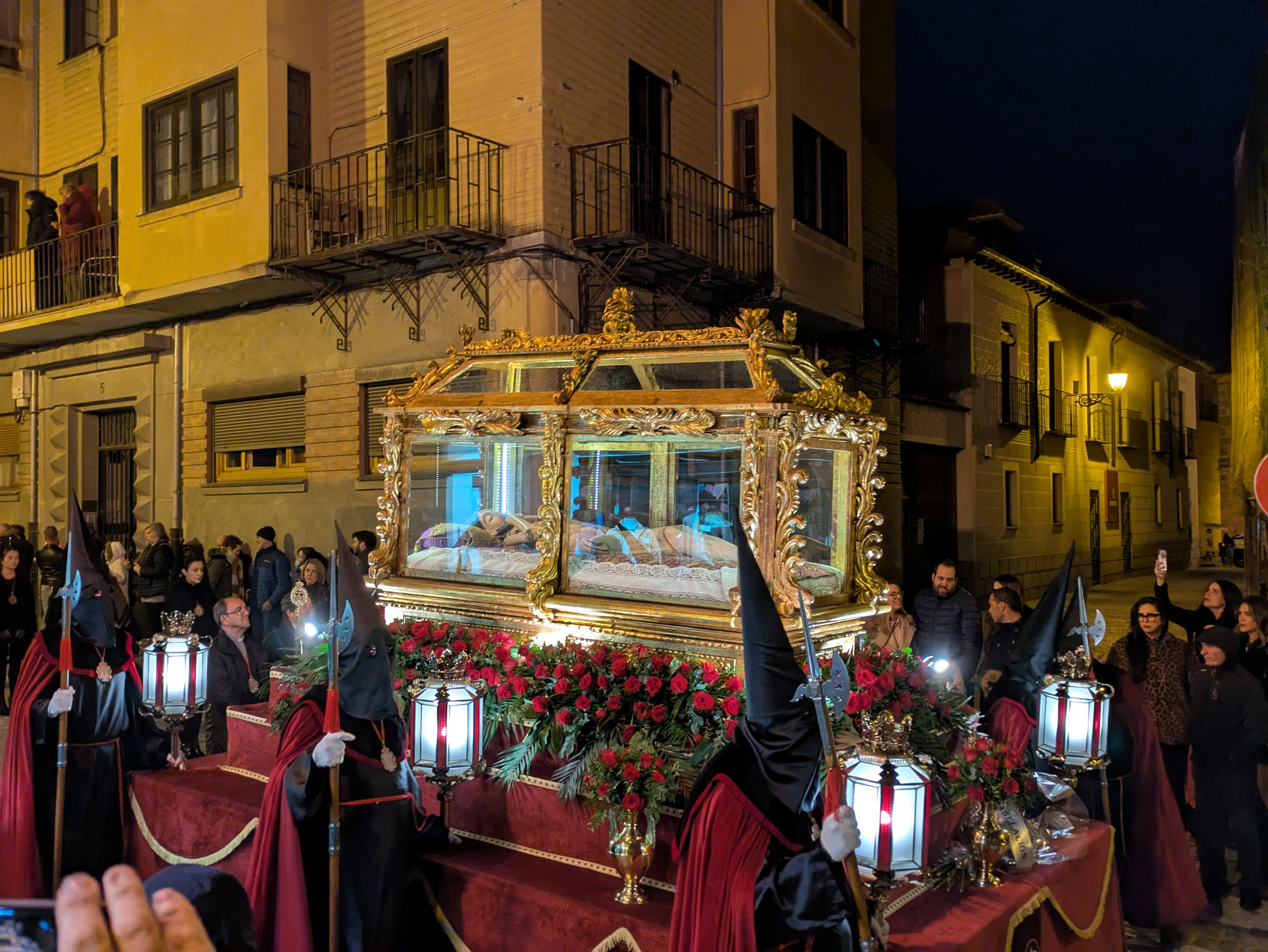
Procesión of the Cofradía del Cristo de los Gascones

=== Real Cofradía de la Santa y Venerable Esclavitud y del Santo Entierro del Cristo de los Gascones (Royal Brotherhood of the Holy and Venerable Slavery and of the Holy Burial of the Christ of the Gascones) ===
The brotherhood was founded in 1647 and based in the Church of San Justo y Pastor, it carries the float of the 'Cristo de los Gascones', an anonymous work from the 11th-12th century. They wear a black habit and hood, together with a crimson velvet cloak. It is accompanied by the Ilustre colegio de abogados de Segovia, la Curia Segovia and the brotherhood's titular bugle and drum band.

=== Feligresía de San Andrés. "Camino del Sepulcro" (Parish of San Andrés. "Road to the Sepulcher) ===
The brotherhood was founded in 1979 and based in the Church of San Andrés, it carries the floats of 'Santo Cristo de la Paciencia' (Holy Christ of Patience) and 'Cristo Yacente' (Rucumbent Christ) by an anonymous author during the 17th century and Gregorio Fernández, respectively. They wear their habit and unassembled capirote in matt black, together with a matt white sash. It is accompanied by the band El Cirineo.

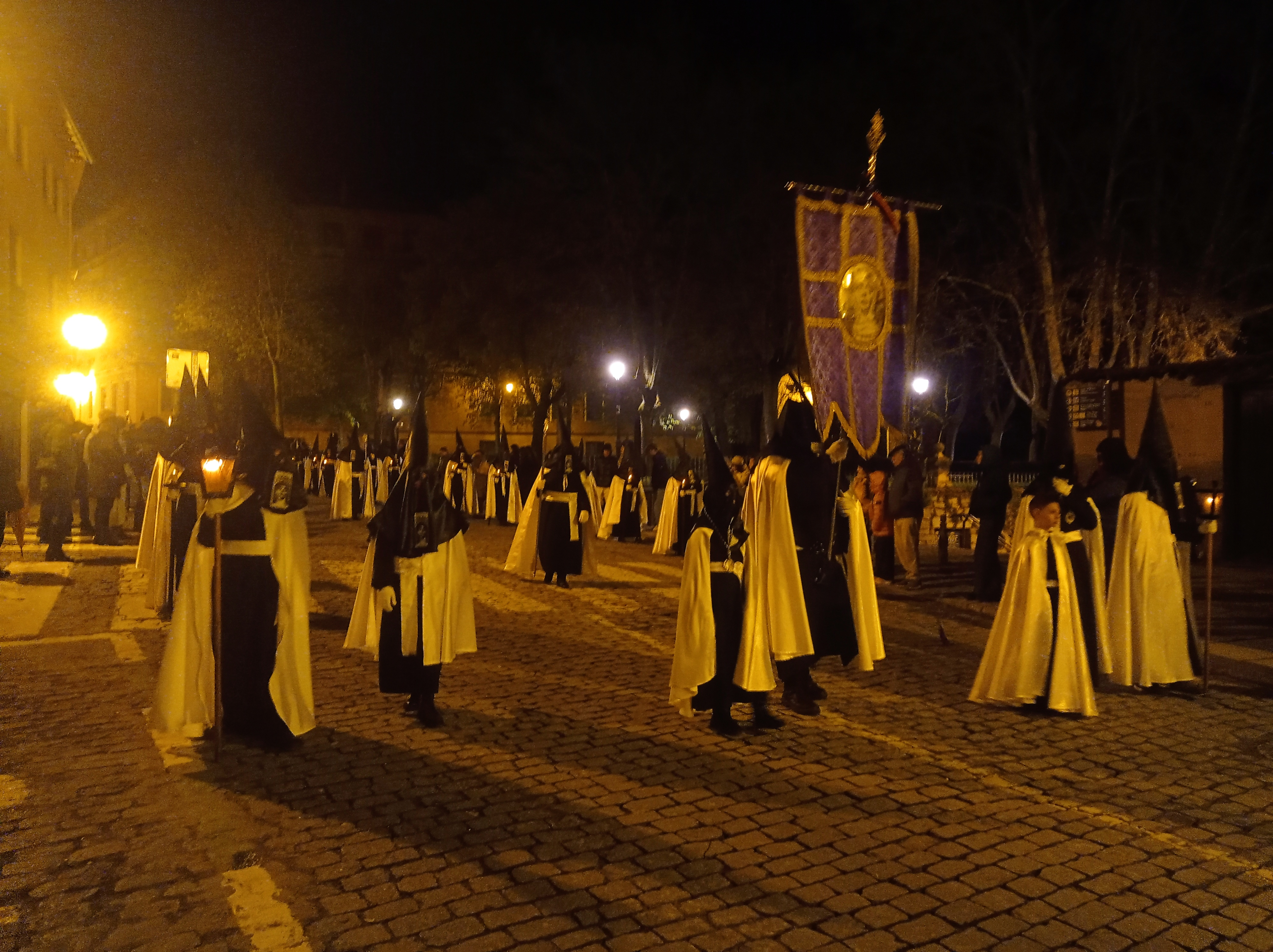
Procession of the Hermandad de Nuestra Señora de la Soledad Dolorosa

=== Hermandad de Nuestra Señora de la Soledad Dolorosa. Cofradía del Recogimiento (Brotherhood of Our Lady of the Sorrowful Solitude. Brotherhood of the Recogimiento) ===
Brotherhood founded in 1921 and based in the Church of Santa Eulalia, it carries the floats ‘Santo Cristo de la Esperanza' (Holy Christ of the Hope), 'Santo Cristo Atado a la Columna' (Holy Christ Tied to the Column) and 'Nuestra Señora de la Soledad Dolorosa’ (Our Lady of Sorrowful Solitude). All are by anonymous authors. They wear a black habit and capirote, together with a white cape and cincture. It is accompanied by the band of bugles and drums of the Brotherhood of Nuestra Señora de la Soledad Dolorosa. The carving of 'Nuestra Señora de la Soledad Dolorosa' is escorted by members of the Artillery Academy of Segovia.

== Junta de Cofradías ==
The Junta de Cofradías de Segovia is an official organization responsible for the organisation and administration of the Holy Week in Segovia. The activities it organises are the organisation of conferences, exhibitions and tourist events and cultural dissemination of Holy Week, such as the ‘Adrián Callejo Rubio’ Memorial Competition, organised since 2014 together with the Cofradíadel Santo Cristo de la Cruz, the Palm Sunday Procession, the Good Friday and Easter Sunday Processions, the penitential Stations of the Cross of the Brotherhoods, and Parish churches of Segovia and the promotion and collaboration in the recovery of the Religious Artistic Heritage of Segovia.

During the Procesión de los Pasos, the banner of the Junta leads the processión, accompanied by two horns. The three bearers wear a black habit and hood, together with a white cincture.
