= Falles of Alzira =

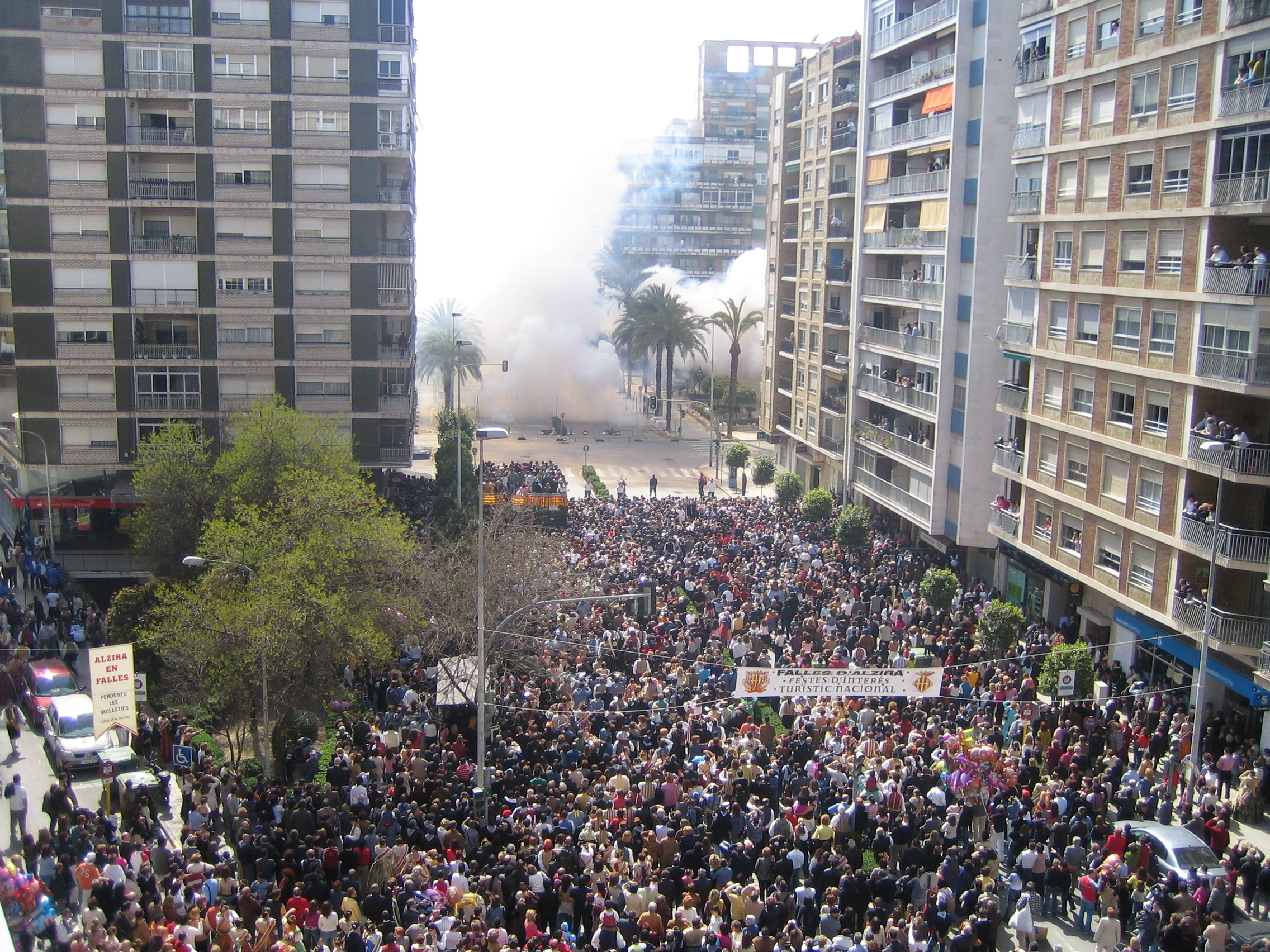
Mascletà in Falles of Alzira.

The Falles or Fallas (sing. Falla) of Alzira are a celebration in commemoration of Saint Joseph in the town of Alzira, which, like the Falles in Valencia and other towns of the Valencian Community, takes place in March. Apart from the Fallas in Valencia, those celebrated in Alzira are the most important festival of this type, due to their century-old tradition, their continuing popularity, and the fact that they have the largest number of active participants (fallers), "commissions" (organised groups of fallers) and "falla monuments" (falles), seventy of which are erected in the streets of the town. The Falles of Alzira have been declared an Event of National Tourist Interest.

A falla is an artistic construction or "monument" made of combustible materials, depicting a particular scene. The most important elements are the ninots, cartoon-like figures made of papier mâche.

The Falles of Alzira are regulated by an association called Junta Local Fallera. In 1989, the first centenary of this event was celebrated; the ceremonies where presided over by the president of the Generalitat Valenciana at the time, Joan Lerma.

== The Falles week ==
The Falles festivity officially begins in early March with a ceremony known as La Cridà, and it ends with the Falles week, which is subjected to a strict schedule of events:

- On the 16th of March: The Plantà, the act of erecting the falla. This should, in any case, be finished before the visit of the jury; the time and date of this visit appears in the official program. If the falla is not finished at this time, it will be disqualified.
- On the 17th of March: Awards ceremony in the town hall.
- On the 18th of March: The Ofrenda, the offering of flowers to Our Lady of Lluch, the patron saint of Alzira. This is followed by a parade of fallers in the evening and into the night.
- On the 19th of March: The Pasodoble. In the afternoon, all the "commissions" (groups of fallers) parade around the streets of Alzira dancing the pasodoble. A jury of the Junta Local Fallera rates the dances and awards a prize for the best dance. At night, the Cremà is celebrated, which is the burning of the falles monuments in the streets, where they were erected. The event is preceded by fireworks, lit by the Fallera Major (the annually elected "first lady") of each group of fallers..

On the 17th, 18th and 19 March, each commission meets at eight o'clock in the morning in the casal (the commission's regular meeting venue), to celebrate the despertà, which means walking around their neighborhood throwing firecrackers. Immediately afterwards the typical breakfast is served in each casal. Then the fallers walk through the streets and visit other casals until lunchtime. At 2 p.m., there is a fireworks display, the famous mascletà, in the Plaza del Reino, which is watched by crowds of people.

== Artistic monuments ==
The falles are usually satirical in nature, making reference to current issues. These monuments can be up to 25 or 30 metres high, and they consist of a number of papier mâche ninots held up by a wooden framework. However, papier mâche has, in recent years, occasionally been replaced by styrofoam (EPS) since it makes the falles lighter and brighter in colour. Signs written in Valencian explain the meaning of each scene in a critical or satyrical way.

Many professionals such as sculptors, painters, and other craftsmen work on the construction of the falles for months. They are hired by the commissions. The falles are erected in the streets on the night of the 15th of March. This day is known as the Plantà. In fact, nowadays the process of erecting the falles starts several days earlier, due to their size and the need to use cranes. The monuments are burnt on the day of the Cremà.

== Sections ==
The members of each commission chooses which "section" (group of Falles that compete with each other) they want to belong to. The aim of grouping falles in sections is to have a fair competition between monuments with a comparable artistic quality. Belonging to one section or another depends on a commission's annual declaration of its budget. No section can have more than ten monuments; if there are more than ten applicants for one section, the ten monuments with the highest budgets enter that particular section.

== Clothing ==
The faller (man) should wear:

- The costume typically used in Alzira since 1968: black trousers, black socks and black shoes, a short black jacket, a white shirt, a white shirt front and a sash of any color with tassels hanging over the left trouser leg.
- The torrentí costume.
- The saragüell costume.
- A costume consisting of long striped trousers, a silk or linen shirt, a waistcoat, a sash, and black shoes with black socks or espadrilles with embroidered socks.
- The use of ties, flowers or bows is forbidden.

The fallera (woman) should wear:

- The formal Valencian farmer's dress, with the fallera's hair arranged in three chignons; the fallera is expected to dress with utmost decency.
- The 18th century costume, with the fallera's hair arranged in one or three chignons.
- The typical regional dress of the Huerta de Valencia, with the fallera's hair arranged in one chignon.
- It is not permitted to use any item of clothing or adornment that is not traditional or is not a part of the costume. The use of espadrilles is only allowed if they are lined with the same fabric as the costume.

The blusón (a checkered shirt) is not considered traditional Valencian clothing and its use is only permitted during strictly private celebrations of the commissions.

1. The current Fallera Major and Fallera Major Infantil (who must not be older than 14), the annually elected "queen" and "junior queen" of the entire Falles festivity, are the only participants allowed to wear the so-called "Alzira model" costume and the combs with the town's coat of arms or that of the Junta Local Fallera.

2. These provisions are enforced by the General Assembly in collaboration with a minimum of two qualified clothing consultants to make sure that the clothing used satisfies the decency requirements and respects the traditions.

3. The traditional sash with the colours of the Spanish flag is the distinctive attribute of the Falleres Majors and the Falleres Majors Infaltils, both those of the entire Falles festivity and those of each of the commissions. The members of their "courts of honour" wear a sash with the colours of the Valencian flag, with the badge and the name of the respective commission embroidered, on a white background, at the top of the blue band.
