= Fiestas of National Tourist Interest of Spain =

Honorary designation given to festivals or events held in Spain

The category of Fiesta of National Tourist Interest (Spanish: Fiestas de Interés Turístico Nacional, Basque: Interes Turistiko Nazionaleko Jaiak, Catalan: Festes d'Interès Turístic Nacional / Valencian: Festes d'Interés Turístic Nacional, Galician: Festas de Interese Turístico Nacional) in Spain is an honorary designation given by the General Secretariat of Tourism of the Ministry of Industry, Trade and Tourism of the Government of Spain to fiestas, festivals or events held in Spain that offer real interest as national tourism attractions. This category was created in 1979 to adjust the new competences of the ministries in the transition. Since 1965, and until 1979, there was only the declaration of Fiesta of Tourist Interest, and with the new reform the honorary designations were divided into three tiers: Festivals of International Tourist Interest, Festivals of National Tourist Interest and Festivals of Tourist Interest.

After five years holding this distinction, events with a wide international projection that meet certain requirements, may be elevated to the higher distinction of Fiesta of International Tourist Interest.

== January ==
Fiestas during the month of January
| Image | Name | Days | Concession |
|---|---|---|---|
| | La Vijanera; Silió (Cantabria); This is a winter masquerade or carnival with many similarities to other celebrations that take place throughout Europe since the last week of December to late February. According to some experts its origin has to do with the Upper Paleolithic zoomorphic paintings and has been assimilated mainly features of the Celtic and Roman cultures. | First Sunday of January, unless this match the new year, then moves to the next | 2009 |
| | Cavalcade of Magi of Alcoy; Alcoy (Alicante) | 5 | |
| | Cavalcade of Magi of Seville; Seville (Andalusia); This traditional Cavalcade of Magi is considered the oldest in Andalusia, and has its origin in 1918. Emerged to bring happiness to disadvantaged children and has become an important event full of music, color and fantasy. | 5 | |
| | Els Traginers of Igualada; Igualada (Barcelona); This popular fiesta of the traginers is the oldest of Catalonia, as it takes place since 1822, in commemoration to Anthony the Great. The main element holding the horse as beast of drag, so it is an endless parade of carts and carriages. | 16-20 | |
| | Festa de Sant Antoni Abat; Sa Pobla (Balearic Islands) | 17 | |
| | Tamborrada of San Sebastián; San Sebastián (Gipuzkoa); Originating in the 19th century, the fiesta begins with the raising of the flag that gives way to a whole day of music with drums and barrels through all the streets of the city until it is lowered again the flag. | 20 | 1981 |

== February ==
Fiestas during the month of February
| Image | Name | Days | Concession |
|---|---|---|---|
| | Carnival of Villarrobledo; Villarrobledo (Albacete) | 11 days after Ash Wednesday | 2011 |
| | Carnival of La Bañeza; La Bañeza (León) | The 5 days preceding Ash Wednesday and the following Saturday | 2011 |
| | Carnival of Vilanova i la Geltrú; Vilanova i la Geltrú (Barcelona) | | |
| | Carnival of Sitges; Sitges (Barcelona) | | |
| | Carnival of Águilas; Águilas (Murcia) | | 1997 |
| | Carnival of Xinzo de Limia; Xinzo de Limia (Ourense) | | |
| | Fiesta de La Vaquilla; Colmenar Viejo (Madrid) | 2 | 1986 |
| | La Endiablada; Almonacid del Marquesado (Cuenca) | 1-3 | 1964 |
| | Moros y Cristianos of Bocairent; Bocairent (Valencia) | | 2002 |
| | Fiesta de Santa Águeda; Zamarramala (Segovia) | 8 | |
| | Els Traginers of Balsareny; Balsareny (Barcelona) | 14-15 | |
| | Carnival of Solsona; Solsona (Lleida) | | |
| | Carnival of El Peropalo; Villanueva de la Vera (Cáceres) | | |
| | Carnival del Toro; Ciudad Rodrigo (Salamanca) | | |
| | Carnival of Santoña; Santoña (Cantabria) | | |

== March ==
Fiestas during the month of March
| Image | Name | Days | Concession |
|---|---|---|---|
| | International Rally of Classic and Vintage Car; Sitges (Barcelona) | | |
| | Misteri de la Passió of Cervera; Cervera (Lleida) | | |
| | Drama Sacre de la Passió; Ulldecona (Tarragona) | | |
| | Misteri de la Passió of Esparreguera; Esparreguera (Barcelona) | | |
| | El volatín Tudela (Navarra) | | |
| | La bajada del ángel Tudela (Navarra) | | |
| | Falles of Alzira; Alzira (Valencia) | 15-19 | |
| | La Pasión; Callosa de Segura (Alicante) | | |

== April ==
Fiestas during the month of April
| Image | Name | Days | Concession |
|---|---|---|---|
| | Devallament de Pollença; Pollença (Balearic Islands) | | |
| | Diada de Sant Jordi; Barcelona (Catalonia) | 23 | |
| | Fiestas de San Marcos. "Toro ensogao" Beas de Segura (Jaén, Andalusia) | 22 to 25 | |
| | Los Empalaos; Valverde de la Vera (Cáceres) | | |
| | Festes de Sant Vicent Ferrer; La Vall d'Uixó (Castellón) | From the second Monday to the third Sunday of April | |
| | Feria de Mairena del Alcor; Mairena del Alcor (Seville) | Week after to Holy Week | |
| | Fiesta of exaltation of the wine of the zone of Ribeiro; Ribadavia (Ourense) | | |
| | Fiesta de los Huevos Pintos; Pola de Siero (Asturias) | 14 | |
| | Festa da Lamprea; Arbo (Pontevedra) | Penultimate weekend of April | |
| | Fiesta of the Olive; Mora (Toledo) | Last weekend of April | |
| | Semana Santa en Astorga; Astorga (León) | Holy; Week | |
| | Festas do Cristo; Fisterra (A Coruña) | Holy; Week | |
| | La Folía; San Vicente de la Barquera (Cantabria) | | |
| | Holy Thursday of Verges; Verges (Girona) | | |
| | Misteri de la Passió of Moncada; Moncada (Valencia) | | |
| | Moros y Cristianos of Banyeres de Mariola; Banyeres de Mariola (Alicante) | 22-25 | |
| | Living Easter of Paradela; Meis (Pontevedra) | | |
| | Pasión de Chinchón; Chinchón (Madrid) | | |
| | Los Picaos de San Vicente de la Sonsierra; San Vicente de la Sonsierra (La Rioja) | Holy Thursday and Friday | 2005 |
| | Lunes de Quasimodo; Olvera (Cádiz) | Second Monday after Resurrection | 2006 |
| | Romería de Nuestra Señora de la Cabeza; Andújar (Jaén) | Last; Sunday of April | |
| | Route of the Drummer and the Bass; Albalate del Arzobispo, Alcañiz, Alcorisa, Andorra, Calanda, Híjar, La Puebla de Híjar, Samper de Calanda and Urrea de Gaén (Province of Teruel) | | |
| | Holy Week in Alzira; Alzira (Valencia) | | |
| | Holy Week in Almería; Almería (Andalusia) | | |
| | Holy Week in Arcos de la Frontera; Arcos de la Frontera (Cádiz) | | |
| | Holy Week in Ávila; Ávila (Castile and León) | | |
| | Holy Week in Baena; Baena (Córdoba) | | |
| | Holy Week in Baeza; Baeza (Jaén) | | |
| | Holy Week in Cabra; Cabra (Córdoba) | | |
| | Holy Week in Cáceres; Cáceres (Extremadura) | | |
| | Holy Week in Ciudad Real; Ciudad Real (Castile-La Mancha) | | |
| | Holy Week in Córdoba; Córdoba (Andalusia) | | |
| | Holy Week in Hellín; Hellín (Albacete) | | |
| | Holy Week in Crevillent; Crevillent (Alicante) | | |
| | Holy Week in Estepa; Estepa (Seville) | | |
| | Holy Week in Ferrol; Ferrol (A Coruña) | | |
| | Holy Week in Gandia; Gandia (Valencia) | | |
| | Holy Week in Híjar; Híjar (Teruel) | | |
| | Holy Week in Huelva; Huelva (Andalusia) | | |
| | Holy Week in Huércal-Overa; Huércal-Overa (Almería) | | |
| | Holy Week in Huesca; Huesca (Aragon) | | |
| | Holy Week in Jaén; Jaén (Andalusia) | | |
| | Holy Week in Jerez de la Frontera; Jerez de la Frontera (Cádiz) | | |
| | Holy Week in Jumilla; Jumilla (Region of Murcia) | | 2003 |
| | Holy Week in Linares; Linares (Jaén) | | 1998 |
| | Holy Week in Martos; Martos (Jaén) | | |
| | Holy Week in Medina del Campo; Medina del Campo (Valladolid) | | |
| | Holy Week in Mérida; Mérida (Badajoz) | From Palm Sunday to Easter Sunday | 2010 |
| | Holy Week in Mula; Mula (Murcia) | | |
| | Holy Week in Murcia; Murcia (Region of Murcia) | | |
| | Holy Week in Ocaña; Ocaña (Toledo) | | |
| | Holy Week in Olvera; Olvera (Cádiz) | | 2006 |
| | Holy Week in Palencia; Palencia (Castile and León) | | |
| | Holy Week in Puente Genil; Puente Genil (Córdoba) | | |
| | Holy Week in Riogordo; Riogordo (Málaga) | | |
| | Holy Week in Sagunto; Sagunto (Valencia) | | |
| | Holy Week in Segovia Segovia (Castile and León) | | 2017 |
| | Holy Week in Teruel; Teruel (Aragon) | | |
| | Holy Week in Tobarra; Tobarra (Albacete) | | 1988 |
| | Holy Week in Toledo; Toledo (Castile-La Mancha) | | |
| | Holy Week in Úbeda; Úbeda (Jaén) | | |
| | Holy Week in Utrera; Utrera (Seville) | | |
| | Holy Week Marinera; Valencia (Valencian Community) | | |
| | Holy Week in Viveiro; Viveiro (Lugo) | | |
| | Mondas; Talavera de la Reina (Toledo) | | |

== May ==
Fiestas during the month of May
| Image | Name | Days | Concession |
|---|---|---|---|
| | Romería de Nuestro Señora de la Estrella, Navas de San Juan (Jaén) | 1-3 | |
| | Fiestas Mayores de Almansa (Moros y Cristianos), Almansa (Castila-La Mancha) | 1-6 | |
| | Festival de los Patios Cordobeses, Córdoba | 3-14 | |
| | First Sunday of Pentecost, La Caballada of Atienza (Guadalajara) | | |
| | Fiestas Aracelitanas, Lucena (Córdoba) | First Sunday of May | |
| | Pilgrimage of San Benito Abad, El Cerro de Andévalo (Andalucía) | First Sunday of May | |
| | Day of the Almadía, Burgi (Navarre) | First weekend of May | |
| | Fiesta de las Cruces, Córdoba | First week of May | |
| | Fiesta of the first Friday of May, Jaca (Huesca) | First Friday of May | |
| | Fiestas de la Santa Cruz, Santa Cruz de Tenerife (Islas Canarias) | | |
| | Fiestas de la Santísima Vera Cruz, Caravaca de la Cruz (Murcia) | | |
| | Fiesta de la Santa Cruz, Feria (Badajoz) | | |
| | Fiestas Patronales de Santo Domingo, Santo Domingo de la Calzada (La Rioja) | 10-15 | |
| | Fiestas Patronales de Madrid (Fiestas de San Isidro), Madrid | 14-18 | |
| | Fiestas Hispano-Arabs in honor to Saint Boniface, Petrer (Alicante) | 14-18 | |
| | Festa de la Llana, Ripoll (Girona) | 20-21 | |
| | L'aplec del cargol, Lleida | 29 May - 1 June | |
| | Pilgrimage of San Isidro Labrador, Realejo Alto (Santa Cruz de Tenerife) | 31 | |
| | Festa Major de Sant Feliu de Pallerols, Girona | 31 May - 1 June | |
| | Feria de Córdoba, Córdoba | Last week of May | |
| | Feria de Mayo de Dos Hermanas, Seville | Variable date | |

== June ==
Fiestas during the month of June
| Image | Name | Days | Concession |
|---|---|---|---|
| | Fiestas de San Juan del Monte; Miranda de Ebro (Burgos) | | |
| | Moros y Cristianos of Elda; Elda (Alicante) | 4-8 | |
| | Aplec de la Sardana; Calella (Barcelona) | 7 | |
| | Pecados y Danzantes de Camuñas (Sins and Dancers of Camuñas); Camuñas (Toledo) | | |
| | National Pilgrimage of the Gipsies; Sanctuary of la Virgen de la Sierra; Cabra (Córdoba) | | |
| | Corpus Christi of Ponteareas; Ponteareas (Pontevedra) | | |
| | Corpus Christi of Mazo; Villa de Mazo (Santa Cruz de Tenerife) | | |
| | Patum, Corpus Christi and next Sunday of Berga. Berga (Barcelona) | | |
| | Corpus Christi of El Colacho; Castrillo de Murcia (Burgos). | | |
| | Corpus Christi of Toledo; Toledo | | |
| | Corpus Christi of Zahara de la Sierra; Zahara de la Sierra (Cádiz) | | |
| | Octava del Corpus; Peñalsordo (Badajoz) | | |
| | Bonfires of Saint John of A Coruña; A Coruña | 23 | |
| | Dancers of the Octava del Corpus; Valverde de los Arroyos (Guadalajara) | 21 | |
| | Fiestas de San Juan; Coria (Cáceres) | 23-29 | |
| | Haro Wine Festival (Fiestas de San Juan, San Felices y San Pedro). Haro (La Rioja) | 24-29 | |
| | Fiestas de San Pedro; Tudela (Navarre) | 28-29 | |
| | Fiestas de San Juan Bautista; Baños de Cerrato (Palencia) | 28 | |
| | Fiestas de San Pedro. L'Amuravela. Cudillero (Asturias) | 29 | |
| | San Martzialgo alardea Irun (Gipuzkoa) | 30 | |
| | Festival of the Medieval Theatre; Hita (Guadalajara) | | |
| | Pilgrimage to the Hermitage of San Pablo; Camarena de la Sierra (Teruel) | Last weekend of June | |

== July ==
Fiestas during the month of July
| Image | Name | Days | Concession |
|---|---|---|---|
| | Fiestas del Cordero, Lena (Asturias). | First Sunday of July | |
| | Festas de San Antón, Gastronomic Fiesta da Solla, Catoira (Pontevedra) | Second Sunday of July | |
| | The Coso Blanco, Castro Urdiales (Cantabria) | First Friday of July | |
| | A Rapa das Bestas, A Estrada (Pontevedra) | 4-6 | |
| | A Rapa das Bestas, Viveiro (Lugo) | 4-6 | |
| | Els Bous a la Mar, Dénia (Alicante) | 4-12 | |
| | International Rafting of the River Noguera-Pallaresa, Sort (Lleida) | 5-11 | |
| | Festival of the Cider of Nava, Nava (Asturias) | 10-12 | |
| | Festas de San Benitiño de Lérez, Pontevedra (Galicia) | 11 | |
| | Aplec de la Sardana, Olot (Girona). | 12 | |
| | Romería Regional de San Benito Abad, San Cristóbal de La Laguna (Santa Cruz de Tenerife) | 12 | |
| | Fiestas de la Virgen del Carmen, San Pedro del Pinatar (Region of Murcia) | 16 | |
| | Commemorates Fiestas to the Battle of Bailén, Bailén (Jaén) | 19-22 | |
| | Tortosa Renaissance Festival, Tortosa (Catalonia) | 20-23 | |
| | Dance of the Stilts, Anguiano (La Rioja) | 22-23 | |
| | Festes Tradicionals de Santa Cristina, Lloret de Mar (Girona). | 24 | |
| | Fiestas Patronales de Santa Ana, Tudela (Navarre) | 24-30 | |
| | Fiesta del Pastor, Cangas de Onís (Asturias) | 25 | |
| | Fiesta de Los Vaqueiros d'Alzada, Luarca (Asturias) | 26 | |

== August ==
Fiestas during the month of August
| Image | Name | Days | Concession |
|---|---|---|---|
| | Fiestas Patronales de Estella; Estella-Lizarra (Navarre) | Friday before of first Sunday in August | |
| | Moorish Games of Aben Humeya; Purchena (Almería) | First weekend of August | |
| | Begoña; Gijón (Asturias) | | |
| | Festas da Santa Cruz; Ribadeo (Lugo) | | |
| | Columbian Festivals; Huelva | | |
| | Festa do Albariño; Cambados (Pontevedra) | 2, 3, 4 and 5 | |
| | Fiestas en honor de Nuestra Señora de las Nieves; Agaete (Las Palmas de Gran Canaria) | 4-5 | |
| | Virgen Blanca Festivities; Vitoria-Gasteiz (Álava) | 4-9 | |
| | Festes in honor to Sant Hipòlit màrtir (Moros y Cristianos); Cocentaina (Alicante). | 6-15 | |
| | Fiesta de la Tradición y Romería de San Roque; Garachico (Santa Cruz de Tenerife) | 7-16 | |
| | Fiestas de San Lorenzo; Huesca | 9-15 | |
| | Day of Cantabria (Día de La Montaña); Cabezón de la Sal (Cantabria) | | |
| | Festa of the Octopus (Festa do polbo); O Carballiño (Ourense) | | |
| | Fiesta de Nuestra Señora de la Antigua de Manjavacas; Mota del Cuervo (Cuenca) | First Sunday La Traída; Third Sunday La Llevada | |
| | Festas de San Lourenzo; Foz (Lugo) | | |
| | Fiestas Patronales de Horcajo de la Sierra; Horcajo de la Sierra. (Community of Madrid) | 14-15 | |
| | Fiestas Culturales de Camarena de la Sierra; Camarena de la Sierra (Teruel) | 13-15 | |
| | Festas de San Roque of Betanzos; Betanzos (A Coruña) | 14-16 | |
| | Fiestas de Nuestra Señora de la Asunción; La Alberca (Salamanca) | 14-17 | |
| | Fiestas de la Vendimia; Jumilla (Murcia) | 14-24 | |
| | Descenso Internacional del Carrión (Fiesta of the Pirogues); Velilla del Río Carrión (Palencia) | 14 | |
| | Descenso Internacional del Pisuerga (Fiesta of the Pirogues); Alar del Rey (Palencia) | 15 | |
| | Nuestra Señora del Rosario; Luarca (Asturias) | 15 | |
| | Festa Maior d'Amer; Amer (Girona) | 15-17 | |
| | Festas de San Roque of Sada; Sada (A Coruña) | 15-18 | |
| | Fiesta del Agua; Vilagarcía de Arousa (Pontevedra) Fiesta_del_Agua_de_Villagarcía_de_Arosa | 16 | |
| | Fiestas de San Roque of Llanes; Llanes (Asturias) | 16 | |
| | Exaltation of the River Guadalquivir; Sanlúcar de Barrameda (Cádiz) | 20-22 | |
| | Moros y Cristianos of Ontinyent; Ontinyent (Valencia) | 20-23 | |
| | Descenso a Nado de la Ría del Navia (Swimming); Navia (Asturias) | | |
| | Fiestas de San Bartolomé of Tarazona de la Mancha; Tarazona de la Mancha (Albacete) | 20-26 | |
| | Fiestas de San Bartolomé of Lechago; Lechago (Teruel) | 21-25 | |
| | Festa Maior de Sitges; Sitges (Barcelona) | 22-24 | |
| | Gala Floral; Torrelavega (Cantabria) | 23 | |
| | O Naseiro or Romaxe do Bo Xantar; Viveiro (Lugo) | 23 | |
| | Fiestas de San Ginés; Arrecife, Lanzarote (Province of Las Palmas) | 25 | |
| | The Cipotegato (Fiestas de San Agustín y San Atilano); Tarazona (Zaragoza) | 27 (from August 27 to September 1) | |
| | Fiestas in Honor to the Cristo de los Remedios; San Sebastián de los Reyes (Community of Madrid) | 28 | |
| | Battle of flowers Laredo (Cantabria) | 28 | |
| | Pilgrimage of San Agustín; Arafo (Santa Cruz de Tenerife) | 29 | |
| | Festa da Istoria; Ribadavia (Ourense) | 29 | |
| | Fiestas de la Regalina; Cadavedo (Asturias) | 30 | |
| | Running of the Bulls of Cuéllar; Cuéllar (Segovia) | Last weekend of August | |
| | Les Danses of Guadassuar; Guadassuar (Valencia) | Last complete weekend of August | |
| | Vendimia Montilla-Moriles; Montilla (Córdoba) | | |
| | Fiesta de la Vendimia; Requena (Valencia) | | |

== September ==
Fiestas during the month of September
| Image | Name | Days | Concession |
|---|---|---|---|
| | Fiestas of the Wine, Valdepeñas (Ciudad Real) | 1-8 | |
| | Fiestas of the Mutiny, Aranjuez (Community of Madrid) | 3-6 | |
| | Feria y Fiestas en Honor a María Santísima de la Sierra, Cabra (Córdoba) | 3-8 | |
| | Moros y Cristianos of Villena, Villena (Alicante) | 4-9 | |
| | Fiestas del Santo Niño, Majaelrayo (Guadalajara) | 5-6 | |
| | The Cascamorras, Baza and Guadix (Granada) | 6 September and 9 September | |
| | Festes de la Beata, Santa Margalida (Balearic Islands) | 6 | |
| | Moros y Cristianos of Caudete, Caudete (Albacete) | 6-10 | |
| | Festes de la Mare de Déu de la Salut, Algemesí (Valencia) | 7-8 | |
| | Moros y Cristianos of L'Olleria, L'Olleria (Valencia). | 7-8 | |
| | Feria y Fiestas de Nuestra Señora de Consolación, Utrera (Seville) | 8 | |
| | Pilgrimage of Nuestra Señora de Los Ángeles, Alájar (Huelva) | 8 | |
| | Fiesta de la Virgen de La Guía, Llanes (Asturias) | 8 | |
| | Fiesta de la Virgen Nuestra Señora de las Nieves, La Zarza (Badajoz) | 8 | |
| | Fiestas de Nuestra Señora del Pino, Teror (Las Palmas de Gran Canaria) | 8 | |
| | Festes de la Mare de Déu de l'Ermitana, Peñíscola (Castellón). | 8-9 | |
| | International Festival of Folklore in the Mediterranean (invited group), Corfu Island (Greece) | Variable date | |
| | Pilgrimage of Virxe da Barca, Muxía (A Coruña) | 11-14 | |
| | Festa Major and Correbou, Cardona (Barcelona) | 12-15 | |
| | Fiestas Patronales de Graus in honor to Santo Cristo and San Vicente Ferrer, Graus (Huesca). | 12-15 | |
| | Pilgrimage of Nuestra Señora de Chilla, Candeleda (Ávila) | 13 | |
| | Pilgrimage to la Virgen de Gracia, San Lorenzo de El Escorial (Community of Madrid). | 13 | |
| | Bullfighting in the Sea, Candás (Asturias) | 14 | |
| | Toro de la Vega, Tordesillas (Valladolid) | 15 | |
| | Festes de Santa Tecla, Tarragona (Catalonia) | 15-24 | |
| | Carthaginians and Romans, Cartagena (Murcia) | 17-23 | |
| | Real Feria y Fiesta de la Vendimia, La Palma del Condado (Huelva) | 17-21 | |
| | Day of America in Asturias, Oviedo (Asturias). | 19 | |
| | Pilgrimage of Santísimo Cristo del Caloco, El Espinar (Segovia) | 20 | |
| | Fiestas de San Mateo, Camarena de la Sierra (Teruel). | 18-20 | |
| | Fiestas de San Mateo of Logroño, Logroño (La Rioja). | 20-26 | |
| | La Mercè, Barcelona (Catalonia) | 24 | |
| | Pilgrimage in Honor to the Saints Martyrs Cosmas and Damian, Mieres (Asturias) | 27 | |
| | Day of Campoo, Reinosa (Cantabria) | 27 | |

== October ==
Fiestas during the month of October
| Image | Name | Days | Concession |
|---|---|---|---|
| | Festes de la Sagrada Família i el Santíssim Crist, La Vall d'Uixó (Castellón) | Variable date | |
| | Fiestas de Nuestra Señora de los Prado, Garganta de los Montes (Community of Madrid). | First weekend of October | |
| | Festas de San Froilán, Lugo (Galicia) | 4-12 | |
| | Festa of the Seafood, O Grove (Pontevedra) | 6-13 | |
| | Fiestas del Pilar, Zaragoza (Aragon) | 12 | |
| | Moros y Cristianos of Callosa d'En Sarrià, Callosa d'En Sarrià (Alicante) | 10-13 | |
| | As San Lucas, Mondoñedo (Lugo) | 17-19 | |
| | Pilgrimage of Valme. Dos Hermanas (Seville) | Third Sunday of October | |

== November ==
Fiestas during the month of November
| Image | Name | Days | Concession |
|---|---|---|---|
| | Feria de todos los santos, Cocentaina (Alicante) | 1-5 | |
| | Fiesta de los Humanitarios de San Martín, Moreda de Aller (Asturias) | 11 | |

== December ==
Fiestas during the month of December
| Image | Name | Days | Concession |
|---|---|---|---|
| | Fiestas de la Virgen; Yecla (Murcia) | 5-8 | 2002 |
| | Fiesta de Santa Lucía; Santa Lucía de Tirajana (Las Palmas de Gran Canaria) | 13 | |
| | Misa del Gallo of Labastida; Labastida (Álava) | 24 | |

== See also ==
- Fiestas of International Tourist Interest of Spain
