= Los Picaos de San Vicente de la Sonsierra =

Public religious ritual in La Rioja, Spain

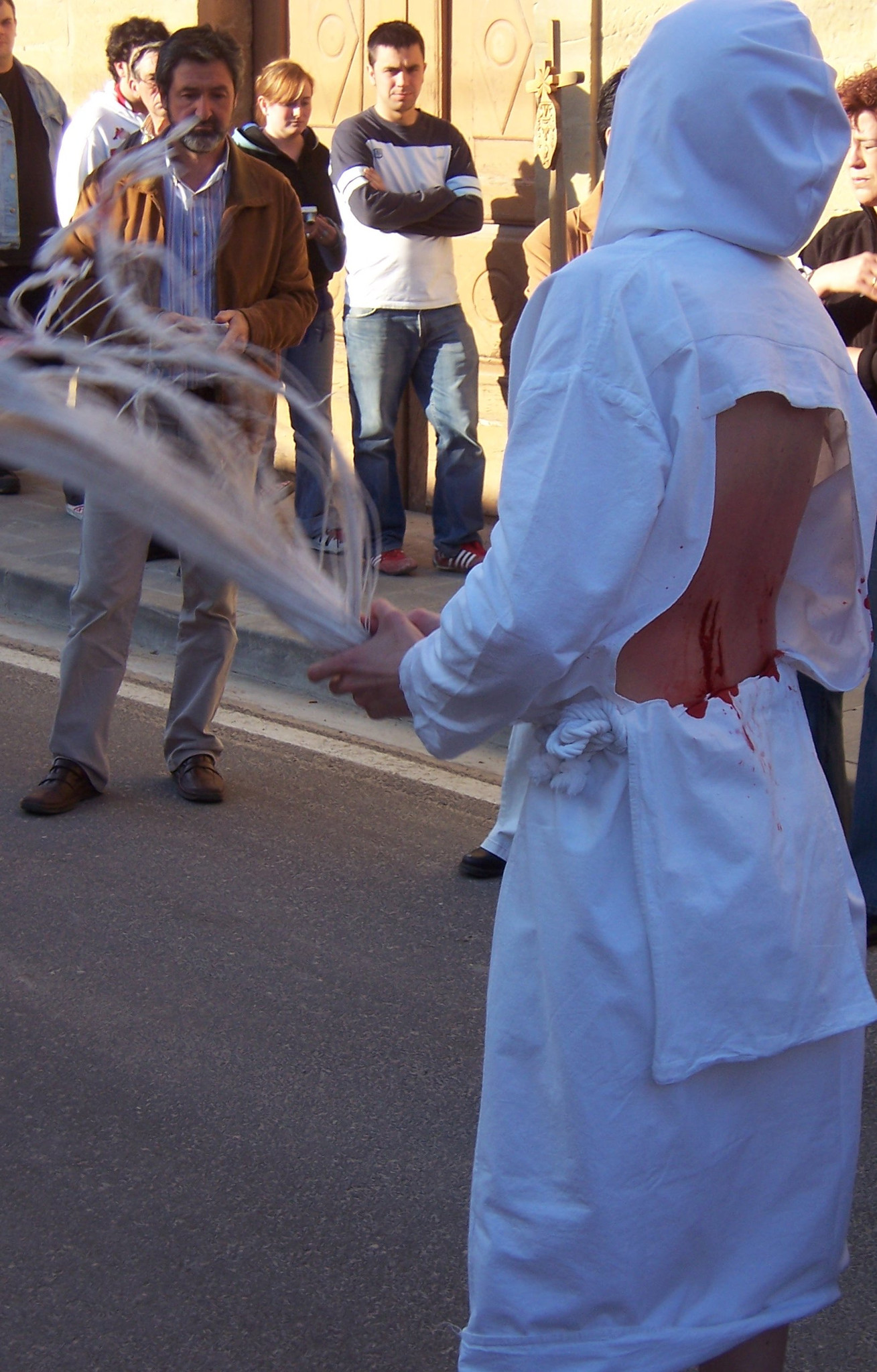
Beating after being picado.

Los Picaos are public acts of penance of the Christian religion that occur in the town of San Vicente de la Sonsierra in La Rioja (Spain). In Christian processions and Stations of the Cross, members of the Cofradía de la Santa Vera Cruz de San Vicente, a Christian confraternity of penitents, practice self-flagellation of the back by using a discipline as a voluntary act of faith; they are called disciplinantes.

On February 17, 2005, the Ministry of Industry, Tourism and Trade of Spain granted the title of Fiesta of National Tourist Interest to be held on Maundy Thursday and Good Friday.

== History ==
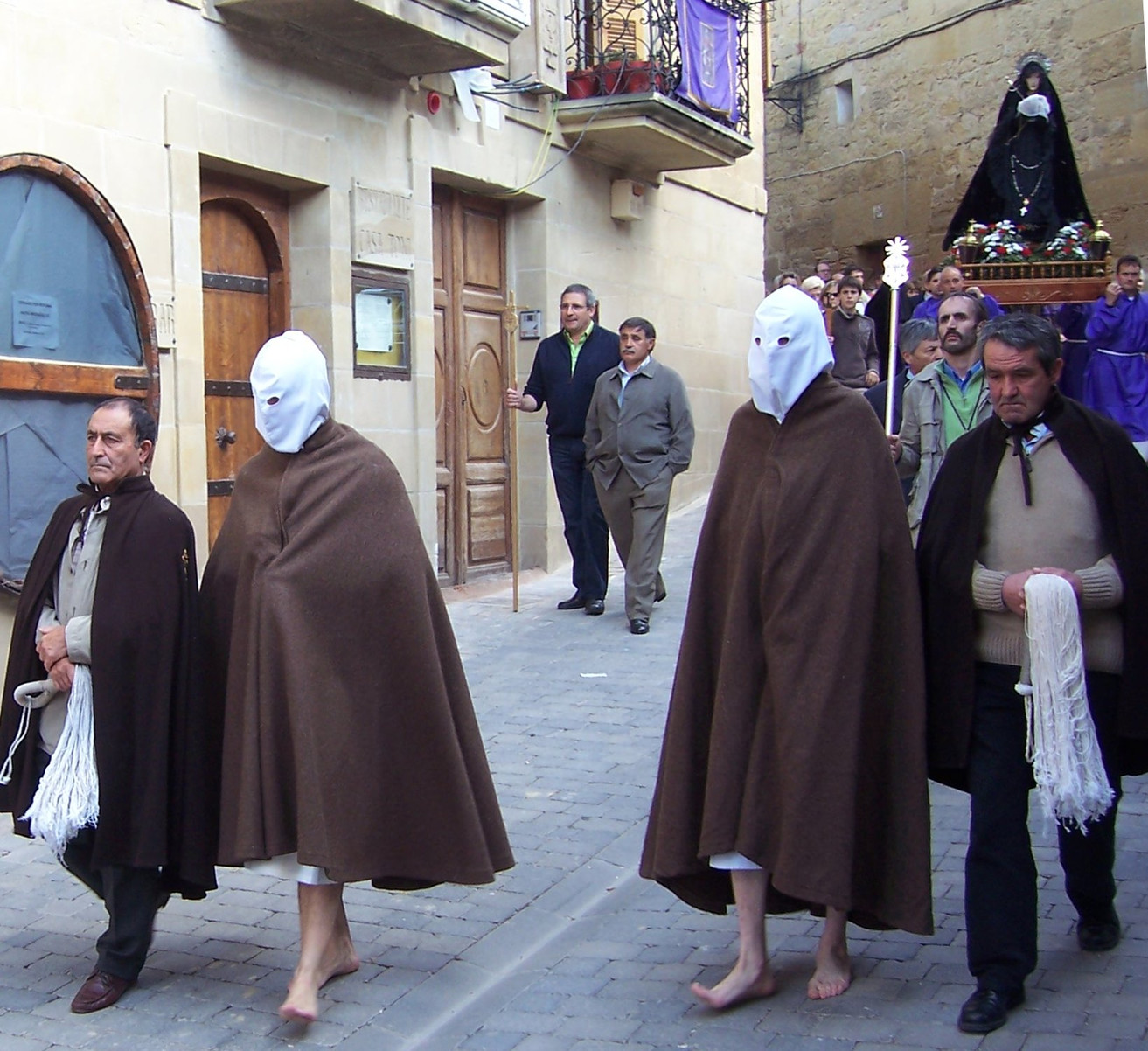
Disciplinantes with his partner at the start of the procession.

It is believed that the tradition began in the late 15th century or early 16th century. Since then has been linked to the Cofradía de la Santa Vera Cruz in the town.

On March 20, 1799, attempted unsuccessfully to abolish this tradition as it was taking place privately.

The clergy of Spain had great reverence, to receive indulgences.

In 1998 it received the rank of Regional Tourist Interest. In January 2004 began the process of obtaining the status of National Tourist Interest, was achieved in February 2005.

== Cofradía de la Santa Vera Cruz de San Vicente ==
The organization of the events associated with this tradition, are managed from its inception by the Cofradía de la Santa Vera Cruz. No one knows the exact date of foundation. On June 19, 1551, were presented their statutes, which was filed the tradition that existed until then.

Its headquarters is located in the Hermitage of San Juan de la Cerca.

== Disciplinantes ==
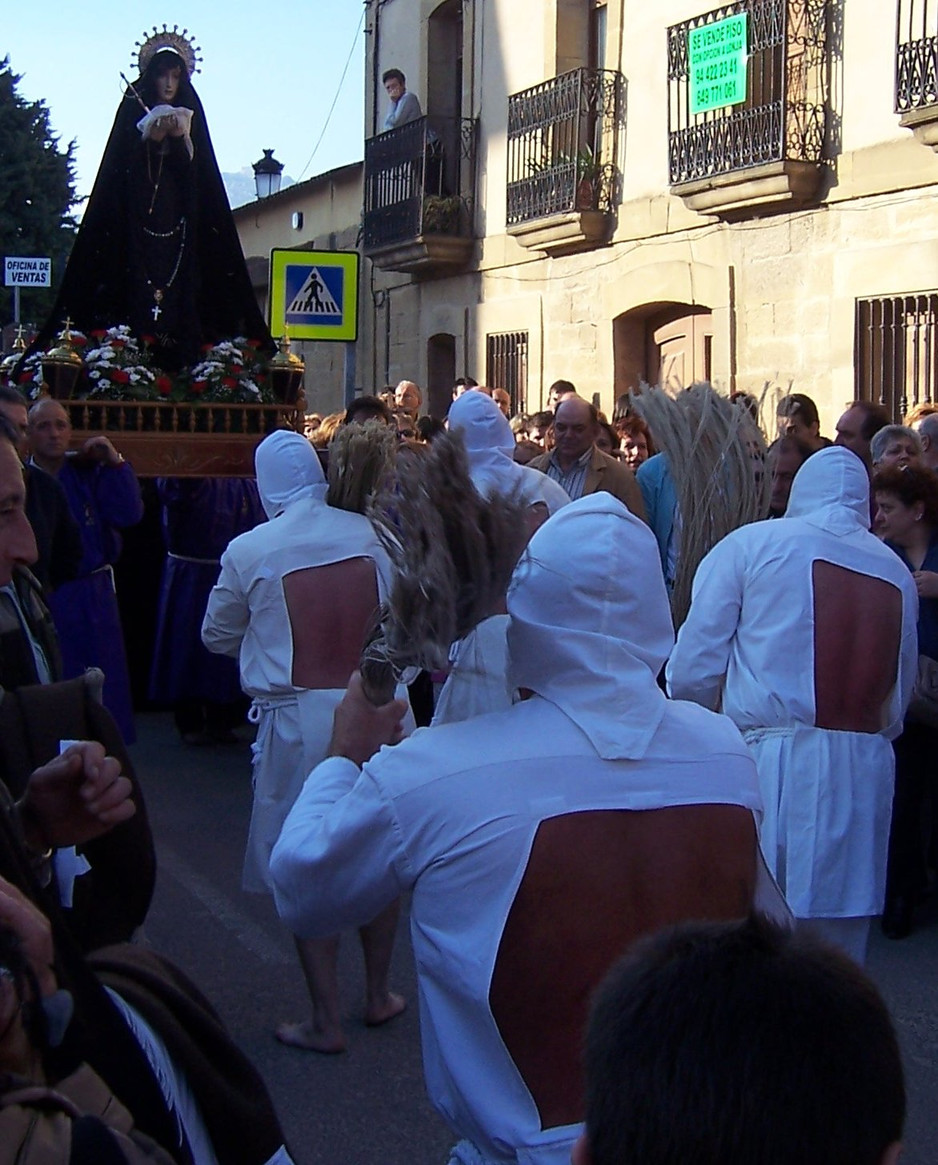
Disciplinantes beating in front of the Virgin.

Volunteers who wish to undergo this penance, they must meet the requirements of being adult, male, and that a priest has to stating that they are Christian and its good faith.

The brotherhood (cofradía) assigns each disciplinary a brother to help and accompany them during the penance.

At all times the anonymity of penitents is maintained.

Most are people of this town or descendants, although some others have no connection and each has found his reason to decide to do this penance.

== Clothing ==
- White tunic knee-length with an opening in the back
- A white girdle around the waist
- White hood with eye holes
- Brown cape with a white cross

== Discipline ==
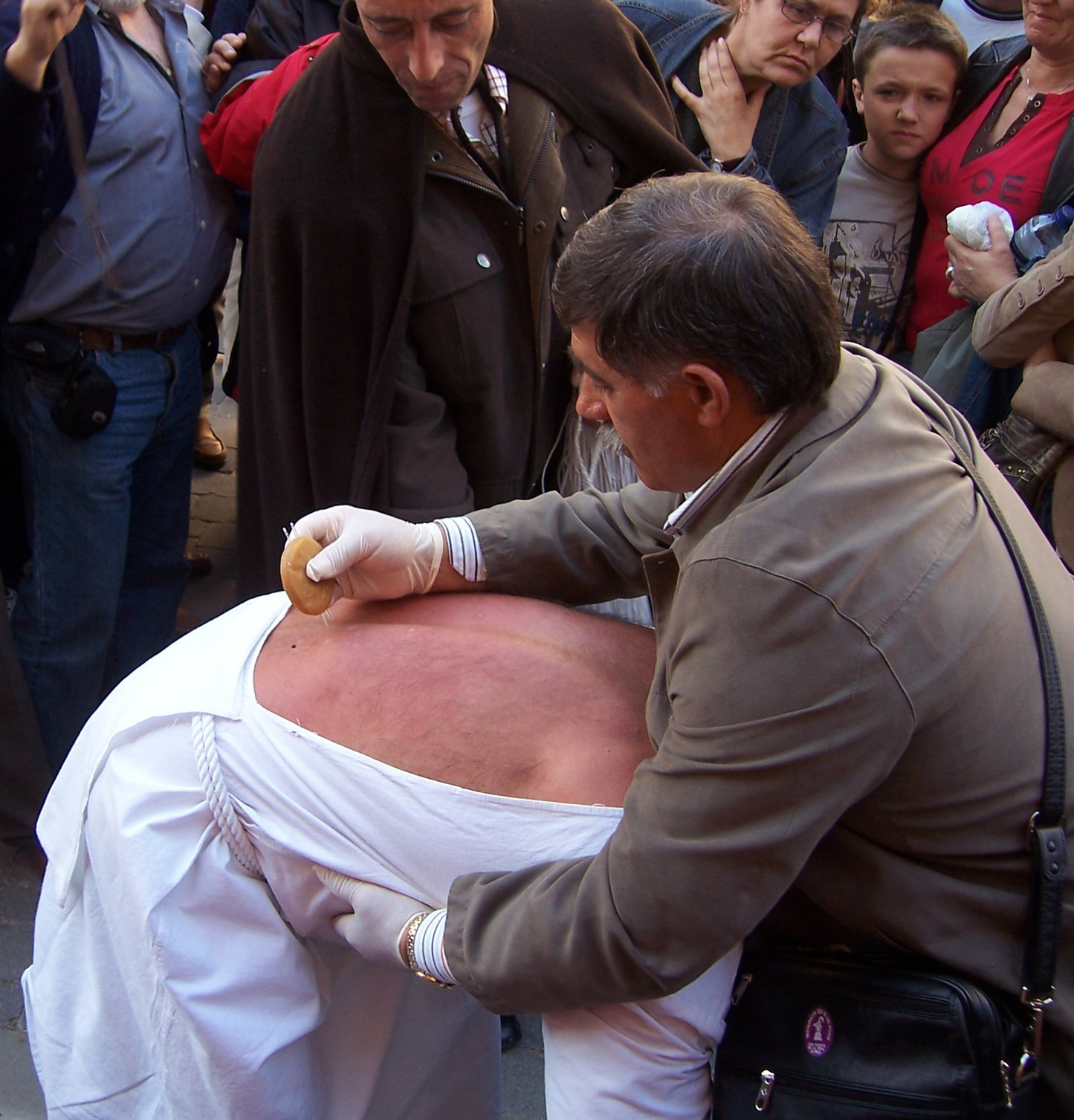
The práctico pricking a disciplinante.

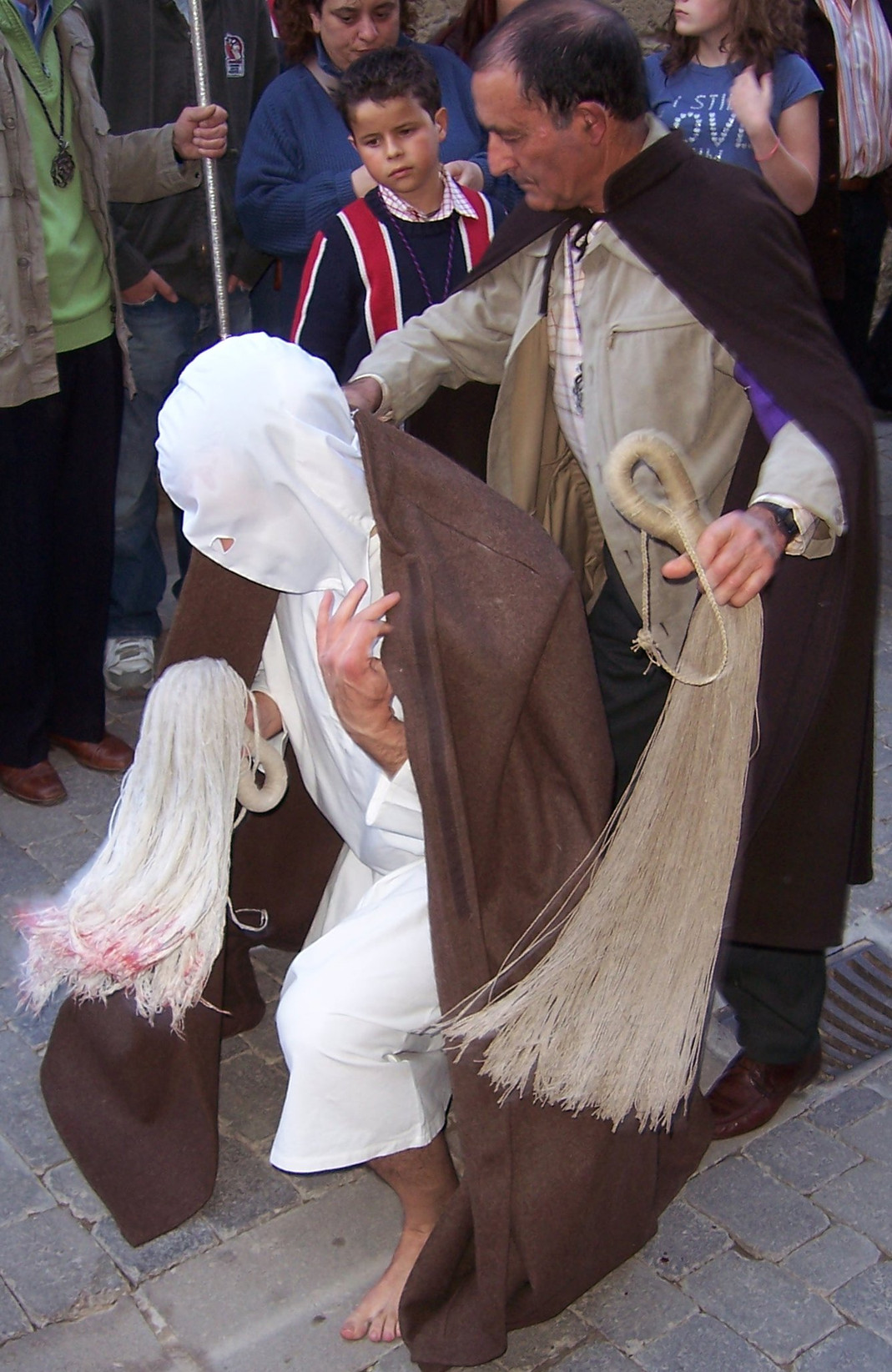
Disciplinante after finishing.

During the processions, each disciplinante chooses at what time he wants to perform the offering, then kneels, prays, and after standing up, his companion will remove the cape and leave the back exposed. With a mop of cotton held with both hands, Sticking going strong lashes in the back, to lash out strongly above the shoulders, each time by one side of the neck in a rhythmic way.

The partner and the práctico (person in charge of healing the wounds) decide when to stop hitting, to start spotting small bruises. There is no set time, but is usually between ten and twenty minutes leading up to 1,000 hits. The handy "práctico" will cut three times on both sides of the lumbar back, using a tool called "esponja", which is a ball of beeswax with six crystals embedded in two in two, so it will receive twelve punctures symbolizing the number of apostles. After that the disciplinante hitself a few times, for that the blood that may have accumulated in the area, can escape and prevent further problems.

Once complete, the partner will return to cover the back and put the layer to go to the headquarters of the cofradía where a specialist practitioner will heal any wounds with rosemary water and a cream whose composition is secret and passed from generation on generation.

== Dates to be performed ==
- During Holy Week
  - Maundy Thursday
    - During the procession of the Last Supper, around 19:30.
    - In the Holy Hour. 23:00.
  - Good Friday
    - After the procession of the Stations of the Cross at about 11:30.
    - During the Holy Burial Procession that starts about 20:30.
- Cruz de Mayo, May 3 if it is Sunday and if not the following Sunday. The Stations of the Cross begins around 18:00.
- Cruz de Septiembre, September 14 if it is Sunday and if not the following Sunday. About 18:00.
