= Cipotegato =

Folk character from Tarazona's (Zaragoza, Spain) festivities

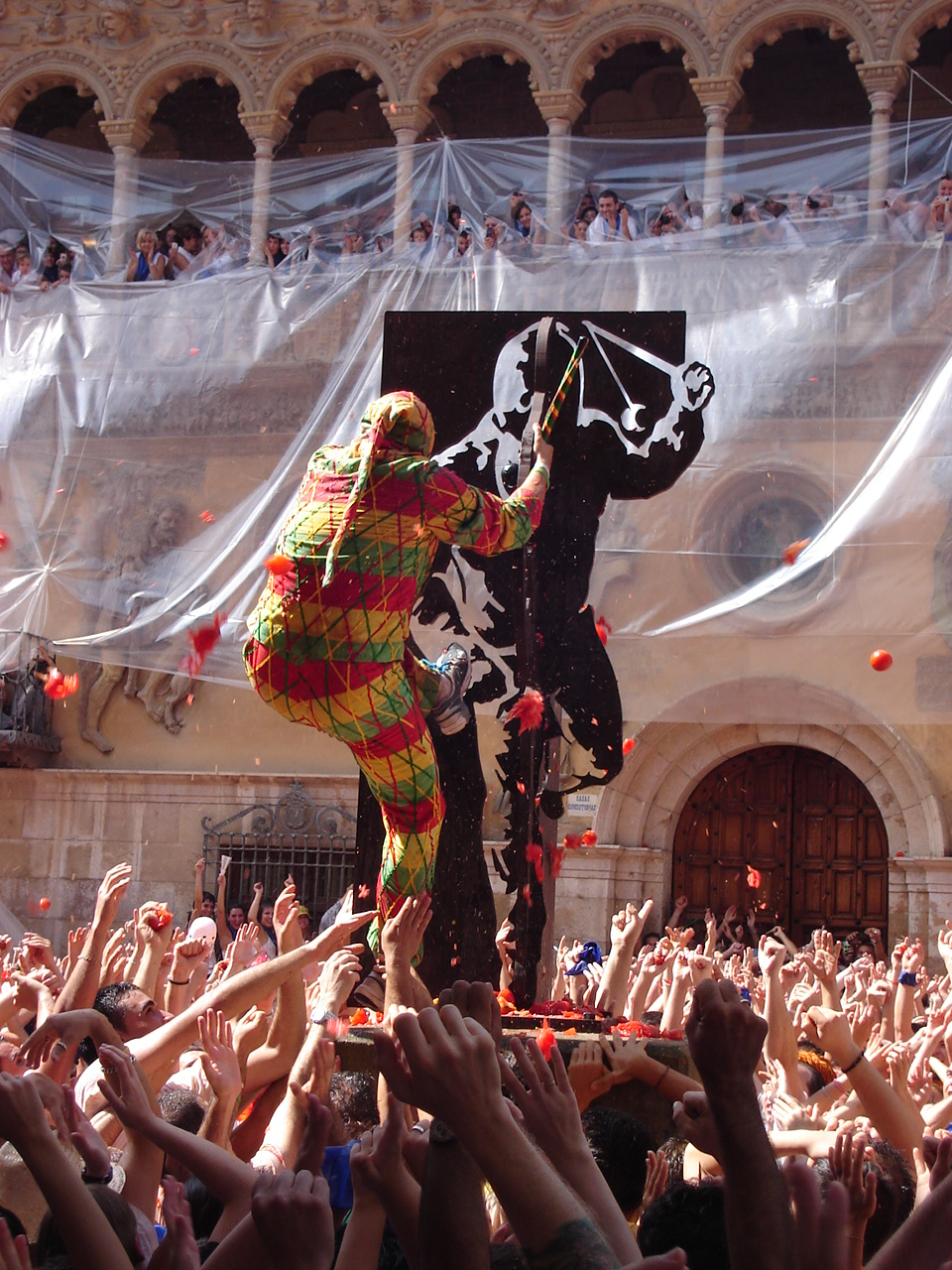
Cipotegato of 2007 raising in his monument in front of City Hall Memorial.

The Cipotegato is a tradition of Tarazona that takes place each year on August the 27th at 12:00 noon. The festivities in honor of the patron Saint Atilano, were declared of Regional Interest in 1998 and National Interest in 2009. The Turiasonense mythical character is hooded and dressed as harlequin with the colors yellow, red, and green. The main day of the fiestas of Tarazona, exactly at 12:00 noon, he steps into the square through an open corridor through a crowd of friends and people who help them. Crossing the square, he is pursued by the crowd that throws tomatoes. If the Cipotegato comes out victorious, they will be uploaded to the sculpture erected in his honor at the square. The Cipotegato is elected annually by drawing lots among the Tarazona citizens.

== History ==
Tarazona had an annual tradition where, during the patron festivities, a prisoner from the local prison was given an opportunity to win freedom. The prisoner was given a stick with a string that ended in a ball (similar to what the Cipotegato currently carries), and was instructed that if he could leave the town, he would be free. The prisoner was then released in the middle of the town square, where the townsfolk would pelt the prisoner with stones as the prisoner attempted to escape the town.

== See also ==
Fiestas of National Tourist Interest of Spain
