= Rapa das Bestas =

Galician cultural festival

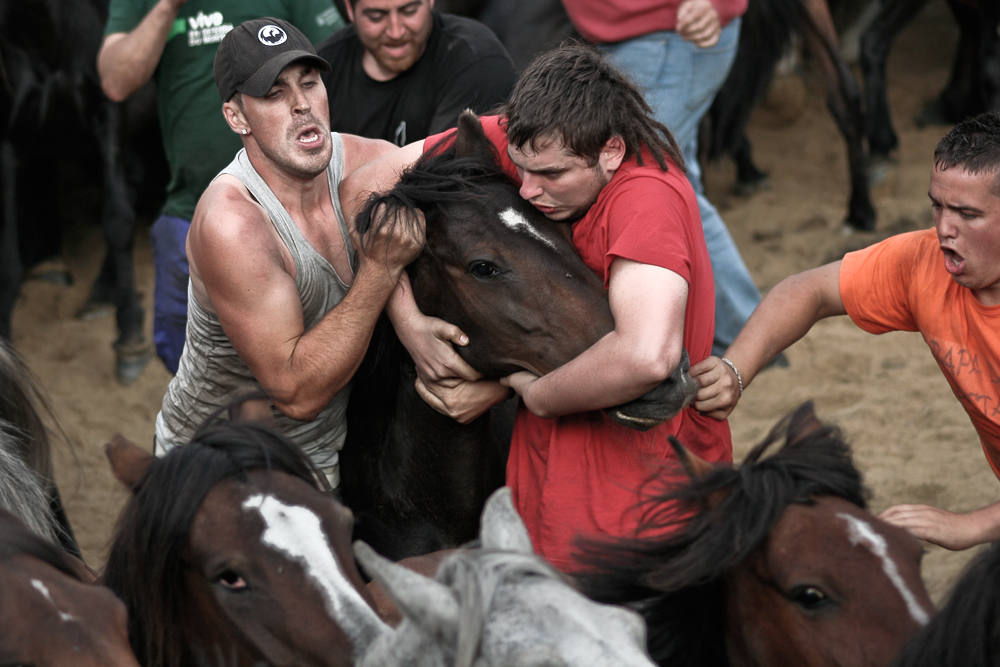
Trying to hold the horse in Rapa das Bestas of Sabucedo.

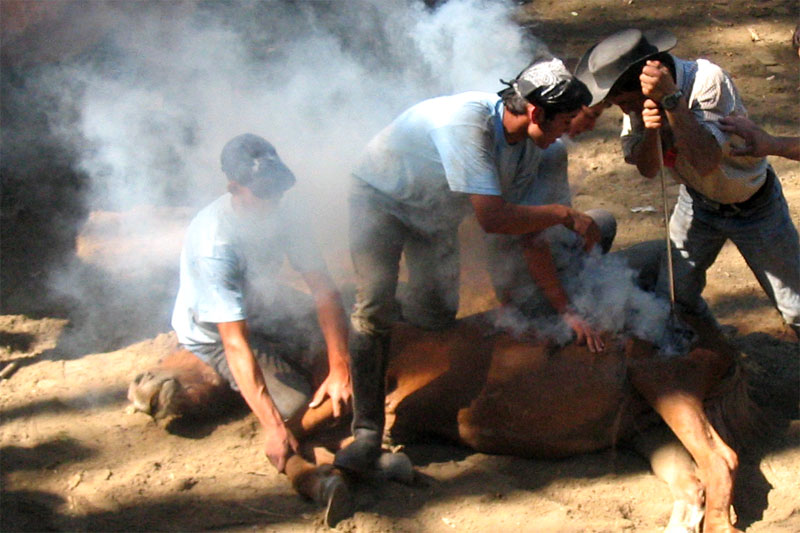
Marking a young horse.

Rapa das Bestas (Shaving of the beasts/horses) is the name of an operation that involves cutting the manes of the feral horses who live free at the mountains in a semi-feral state and that are performed in the curros (enclosed which retain the horses) held in various locations in Galicia (Spain). Those horses live in mountains owned by the villages (a form of property derived from the Suevi, around 8th century) and have several owners (private owners, the parish or the village), each year the foal are marked and the adults shaved and deloused, and then freed again to the mountains.

The traditional festival is said to date back to the 15th century.

== Locations ==
Location of the main Rapas
A Coruña
A Capelada (Cedeira)	June 29
As Canizadas (A Pobra do Caramiñal)	July 12 to 19
Campo da Areosa (Vimianzo)	Mid-July
Lugo
Candaoso (Viveiro)	First Sunday of July
Campo do Oso (Mondoñedo)	Last Sunday of June
San Tomé (O Valadouro)	First Sunday of August
Pontevedra
Mougás (Oia)	June 8
Morgadáns (Gondomar)	June 15
San Cibrán (Gondomar)	June 22
Sabucedo (A Estrada)	First Friday of July
Monte Castelo (Cotobade)	August 3
Domaio (Moaña)	August 13
Paradanta (A Cañiza)	August 31
O Galiñeiro (Gondomar)	August

== See also ==
- Rapa das Bestas of Sabucedo
- Fiestas of National Tourist Interest of Spain
