= Romería Regional de San Benito Abad =

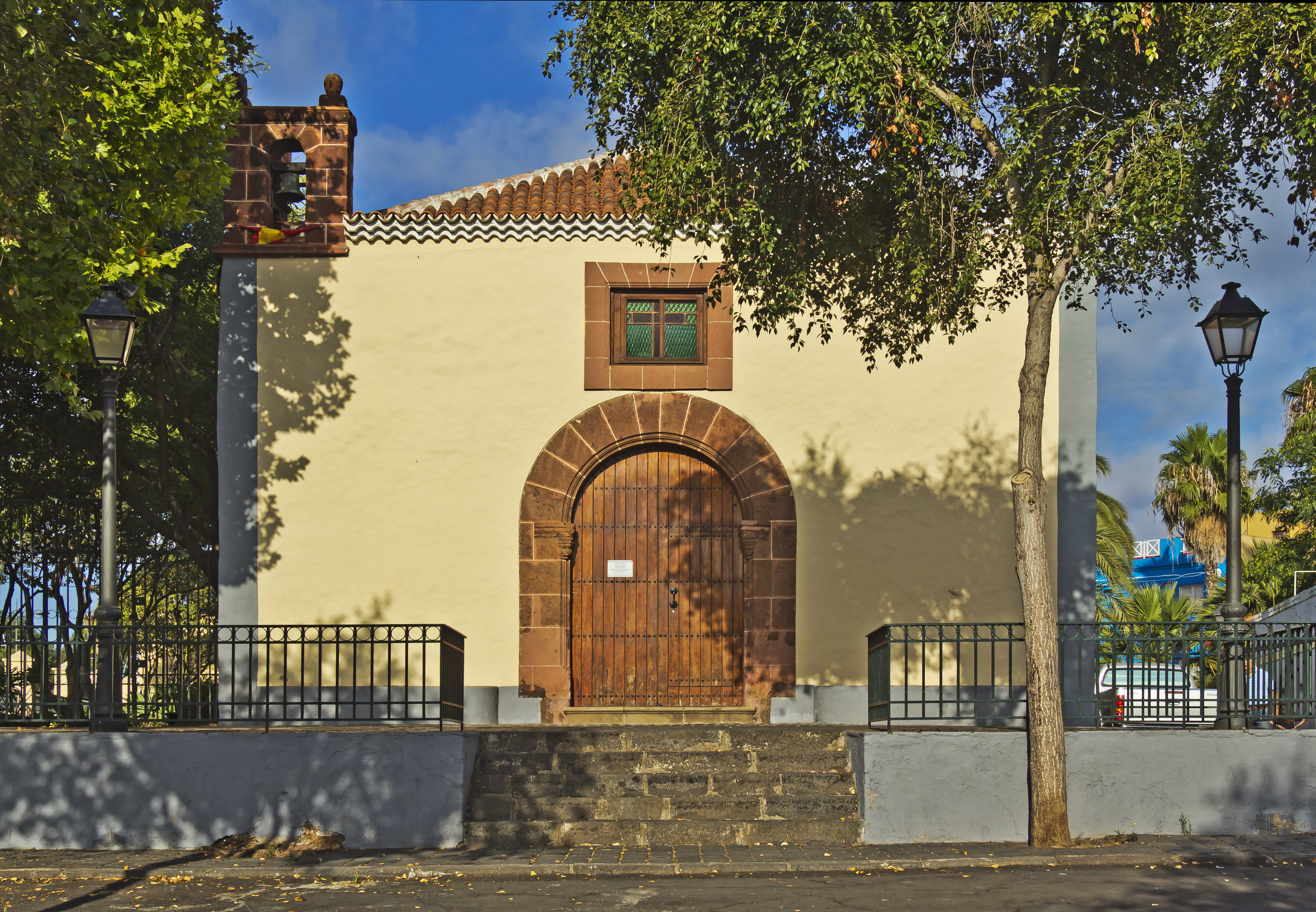
Hermitage of Saint Benedict in La Laguna

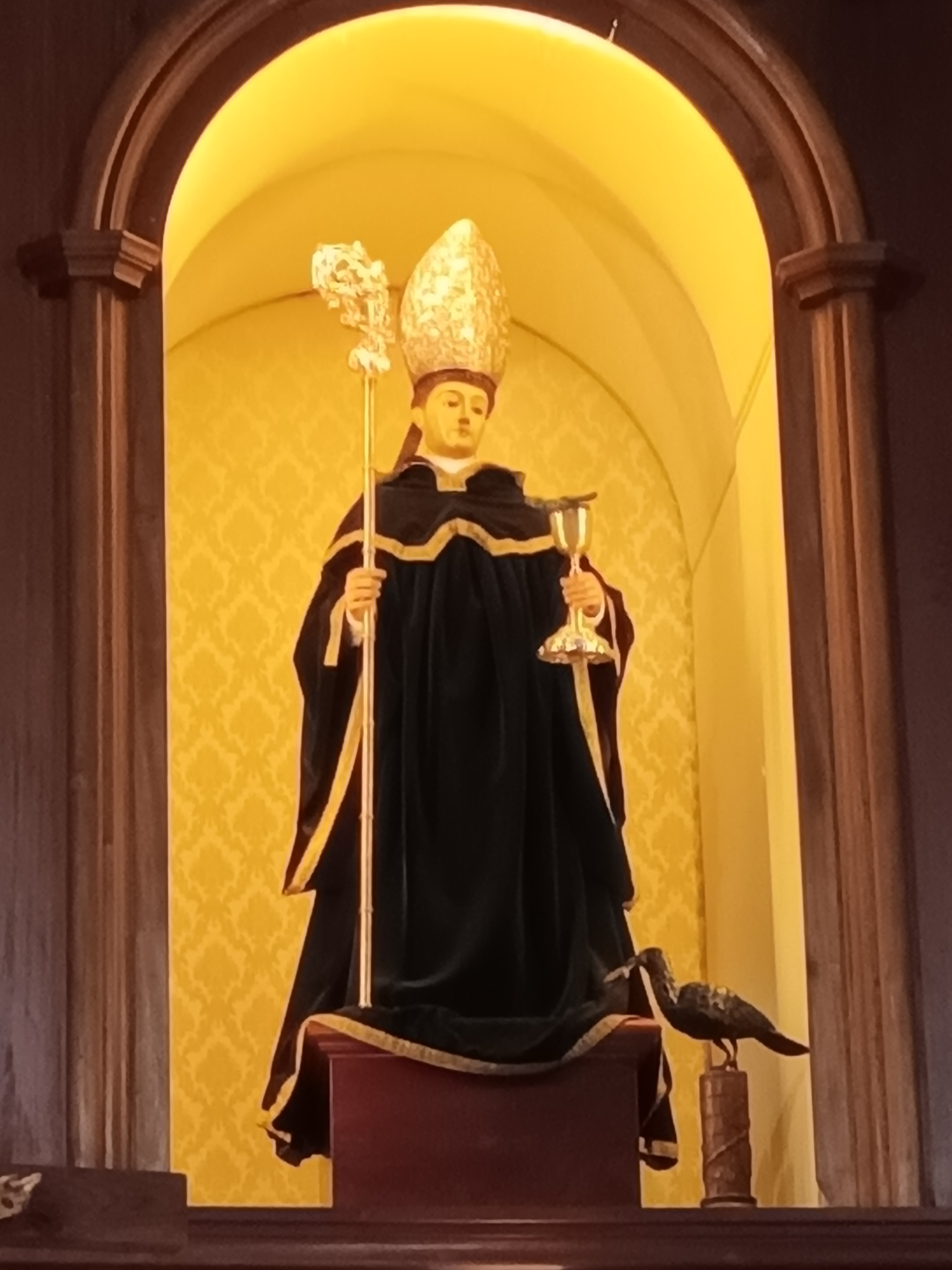
Image of Saint Benedict in his temple, patron saint of the fields of Tenerife

Romería Regional de San Benito Abad it is a popular romeria that is held the second Sunday of July in the city of San Cristóbal de La Laguna (Tenerife, Canary Islands, Spain). It is held in honor of St. Benedict of Nursia, the patron saint of farmers of Tenerife.

== Characteristics ==
Declared of National Tourist Interest, it is the most representative romeria of the Canary Islands, in which participating groups coming from all corners of the archipelago. Moreover, it is the only romeria of Canarias to hold the title of "Regional" (all the Canary region). She is also considered among the most important romeria in Spain.

== History ==
In 1532 the island of Tenerife suffered a drought and the union of farmers placed in a hat, folded papers the names of several Catholic saints. random voting was repeated three times was made; every time the name of Saint Benedict was extracted, which was considered a divine plan. It was a recognition that farmers paid tribute to Saint for his protection and his efforts in securing a good harvest and fertility necessary for field rains in origin. Over time, the presence of the field in the city was acquiring a massive and participatory and the romeria became a meeting of both worlds: the agricultural and urban.

Initially the romeria is held in June, although due to weather conditions later moved to the second Sunday of July. Courtship is carried through the streets in which people are dressed in traditional costumes and decorated with typical products bullock carts. Along the way throughout the city there are also Canarian folk music.
