= Garganta de los Montes =

Coordinates: 40°55′N 3°41′W

- Municipality
- Flag Coat of arms

- Municipal location within the Community of Madrid.
- Country: Spain
- Autonomous community: Community of Madrid

Area
  - Total: 15.31 sq mi (39.66 km^{2})
- Elevation: 3,720 ft (1,134 m)

Population (2025-01-01)
  - Total: 441
  - Density: 28.8/sq mi (11.1/km^{2})
- Time zone: UTC+1 (CET)
  - Summer (DST): UTC+2 (CEST)

Garganta de los Montes is a municipality of the autonomous community of Madrid in central Spain. It belongs to the comarca of Valle del Lozoya

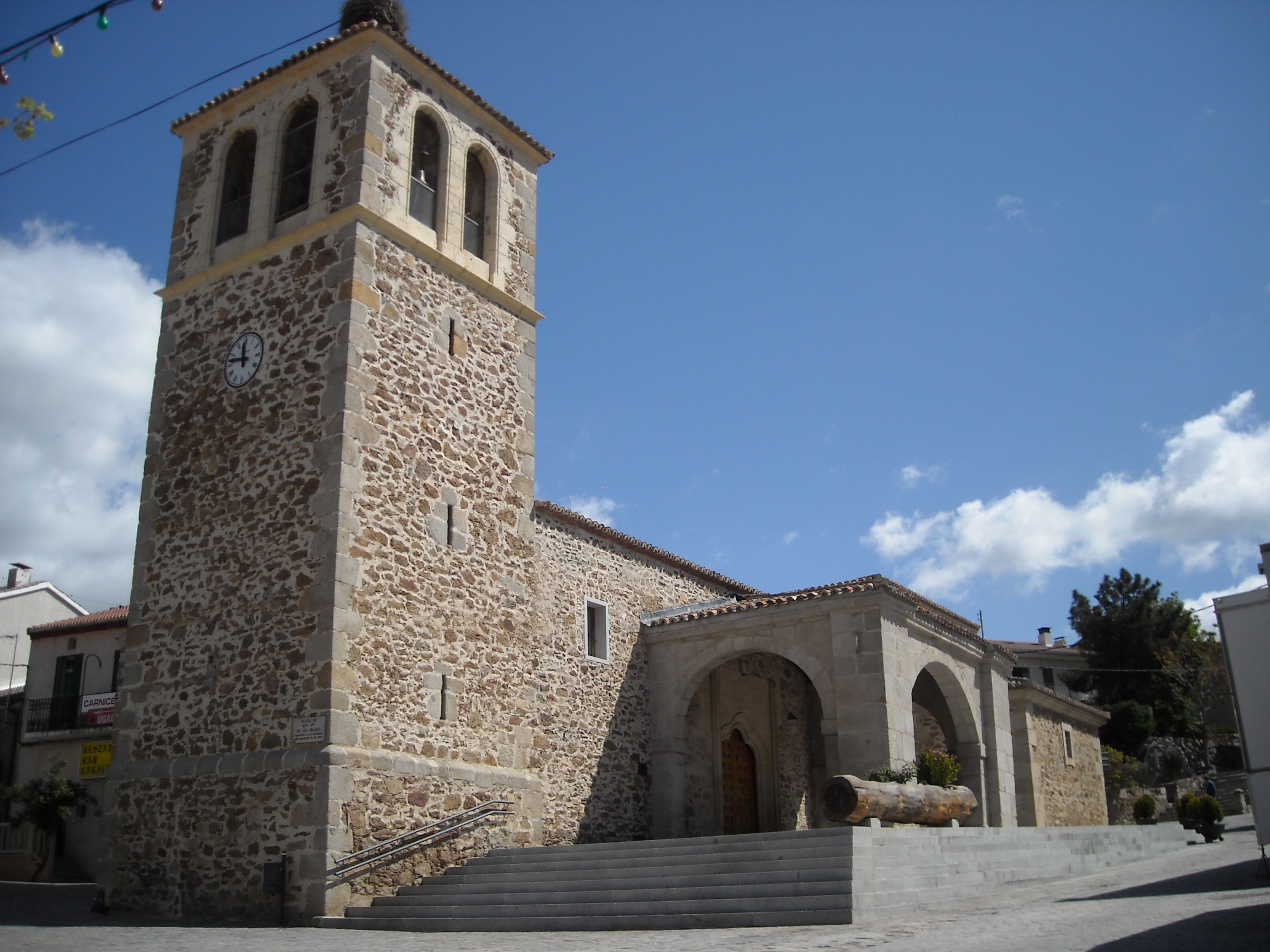
St. Peter's church
