= Zamarramala =

- Village
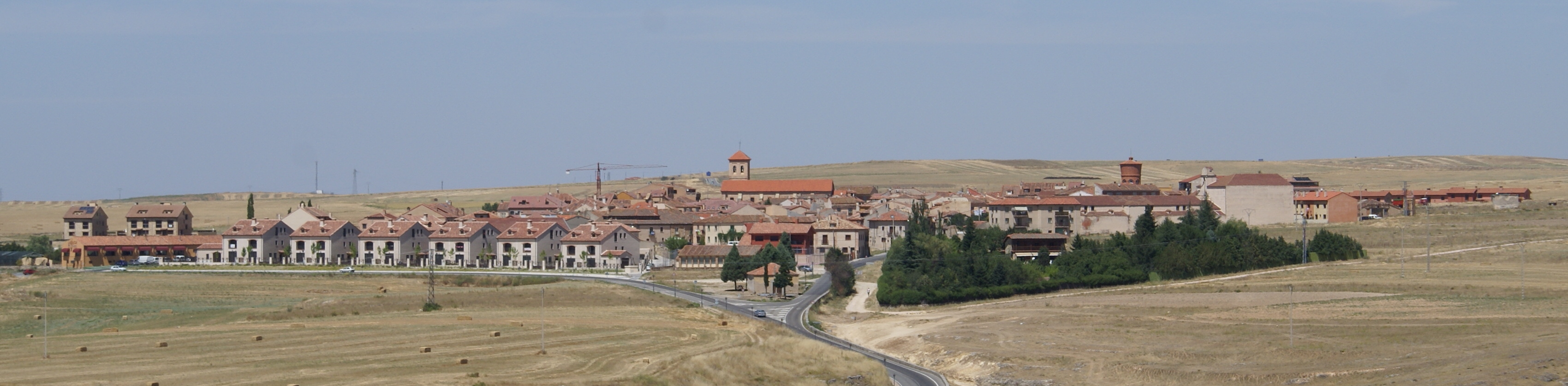
- Skyline of Zamarramala, Segovia, Spain

- Location within Spain
- Coordinates: 40°57′57″N 4°08′05″W
- Country: Spain
- Autonomous community: Castile and León
- Province: Segovia
- Municipality: Segovia
- Elevation: 1,000 m (3,300 ft)

Population (2012)
  - Total: 516

Zamarramala is a village in the municipality of Segovia, Castile and León, Spain. It stands above its surroundings and can be seen from Segovia proper. In the past, it had its own town hall, but it became part of Segovia in the 1970s.

== Fiesta de Santa Águeda ==
Zamarramala is known for its Fiesta de Santa Águeda, declared a Fiesta of National Tourist Interest (Spanish: Interés turístico Nacional) in 1972. The Las Águedas festival (February 5), one of the oldest in Spain, which has been recorded since 1227, and which remembers the value of the Zamarriega women who, according to legend, would have helped to reconquer the Alcázar of Segovia, taken from the Saracens. In this Festival, two "mayors" are elected to govern the town for two days. Participation is mostly female.

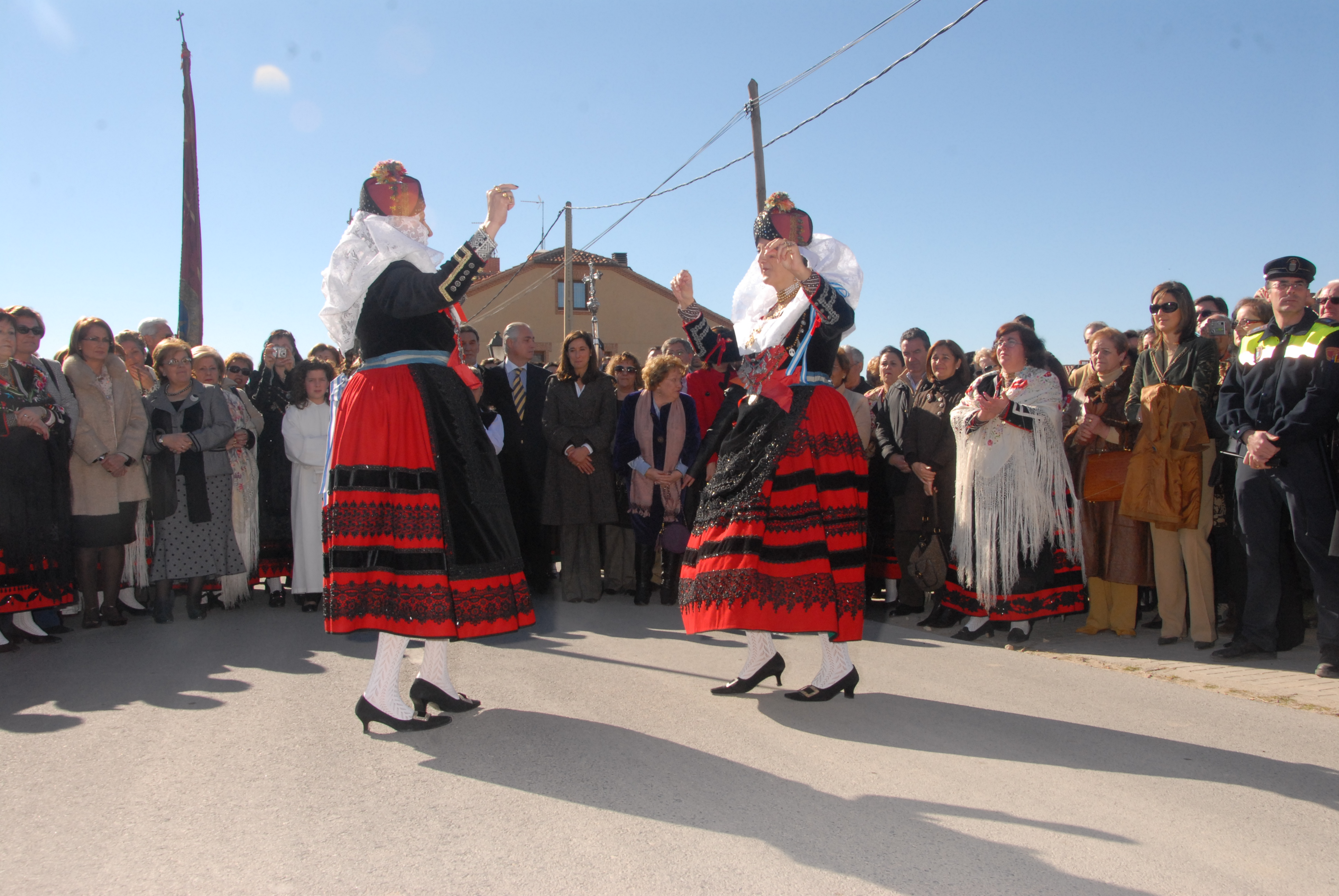
The Fiesta de Santa Águeda in Zamarramala
