= Nuestra Señora de la Asunción =

Nuestra Señora de la Asunción (Spanish for Our Lady of the Assumption) may refer to:

== Americas ==
- Cathedral of Córdoba, Argentina
- Our Lady of the Assumption Co-Cathedral, Baracoa, Cuba
- Templo de Nuestra Señora de la Asunción, Jocotenango, Guatemala
- Universidad Católica "Nuestra Señora de la Asunción", Asunción, Paraguay
- Mission Nuestra Señora de la Asunción de Zía, present-day New Mexico, United States

== Philippines ==
- Maasin Cathedral
- Santa Maria Church

== Spain ==
- Nuestra Señora de la Asunción, Bujalance
- Basilica of la Asunción de Nuestra Señora (Colmenar Viejo)
- Church of Nuestra Señora de la Asunción (Elvillar)
- Church of Nuestra Señora de la Asunción (Labastida)
- Church of Nuestra Señora de la Asunción (Meco)
- Nuestra Señora de la Asunción, Navalcarnero
- Colegiata de Nuestra Señora de la Asunción, Osuna
- Church of Nuestra Señora de la Asunción (Pinilla de Jadraque)
- Church of Nuestra Señora de la Asunción (Tobarra)
- Church of Nuestra Señora de la Asunción (Valdemoro)

== See also ==
- Church of Nuestra Señora de la Asunción (disambiguation)
- Asunción (disambiguation)
- Our Lady of the Assumption Church (disambiguation)
