= Church of Nuestra Señora de la Asunción =

Church of Nuestra Señora de la Asunción (Spanish for Church of Our Lady of the Assumption) may refer to:

- Church of Nuestra Señora de la Asunción (Elvillar)
- Church of Nuestra Señora de la Asunción (Labastida)
- Church of Nuestra Señora de la Asunción (Meco)
- Church of Nuestra Señora de la Asunción (Pinilla de Jadraque)
- Church of Nuestra Señora de la Asunción (Tobarra)
- Church of Nuestra Señora de la Asunción (Valdemoro)

== See also ==
- Asunción (disambiguation)
- Cathedral of Saint Mary of the Assumption (disambiguation)
- Nuestra Señora de la Asunción (disambiguation)
