= Holy Week in Spain =

Annual Christian observance in Spain

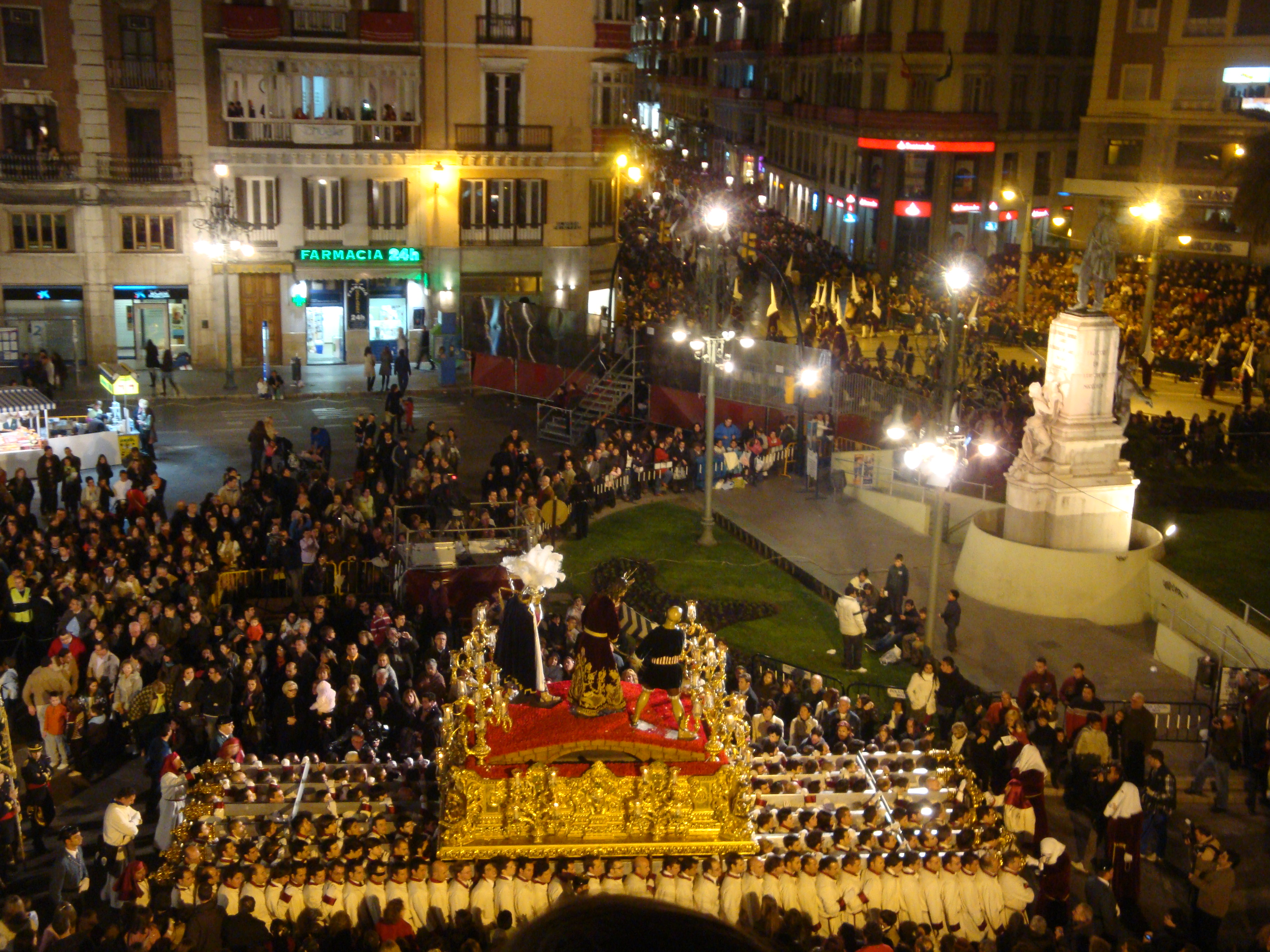
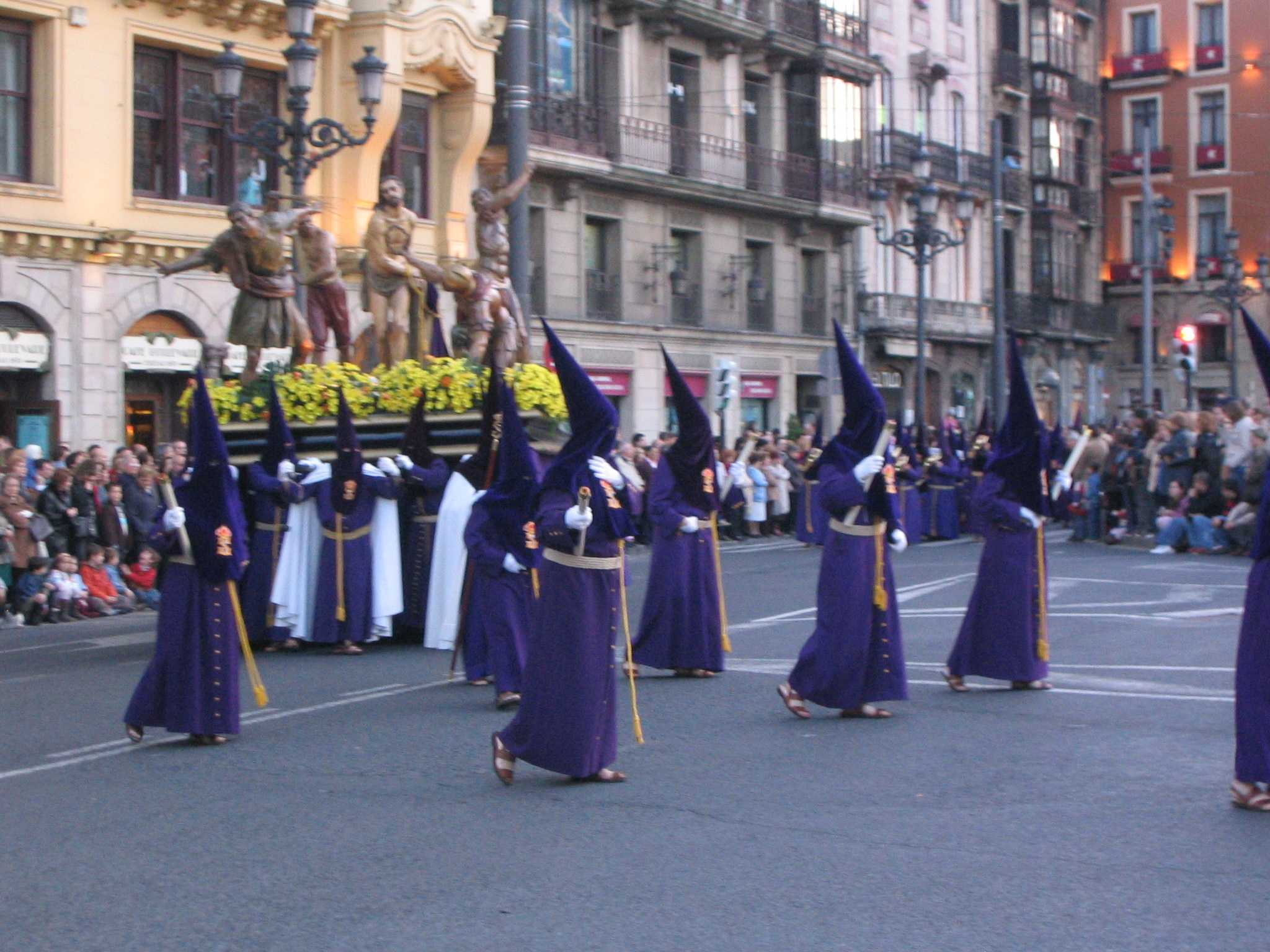
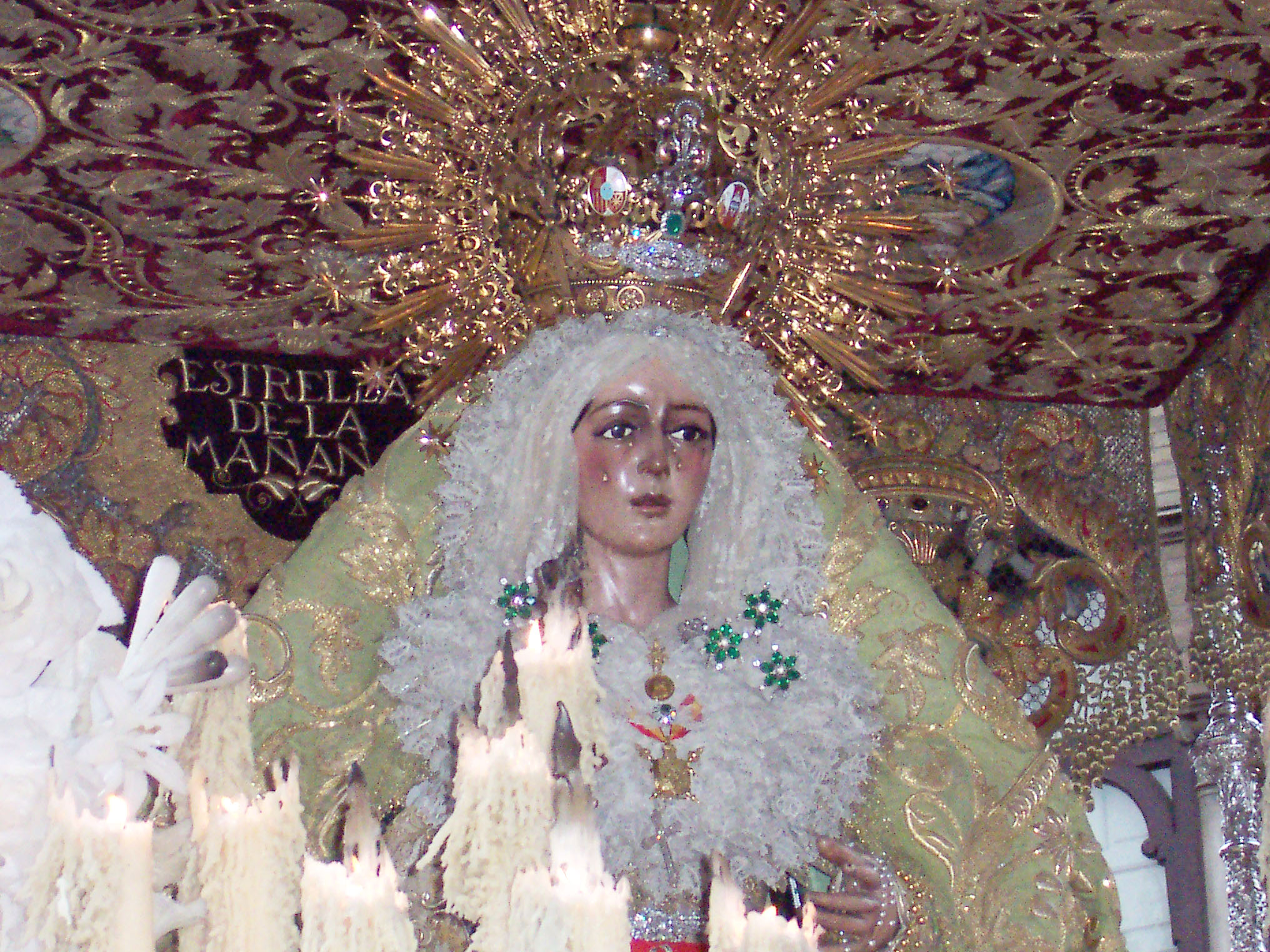
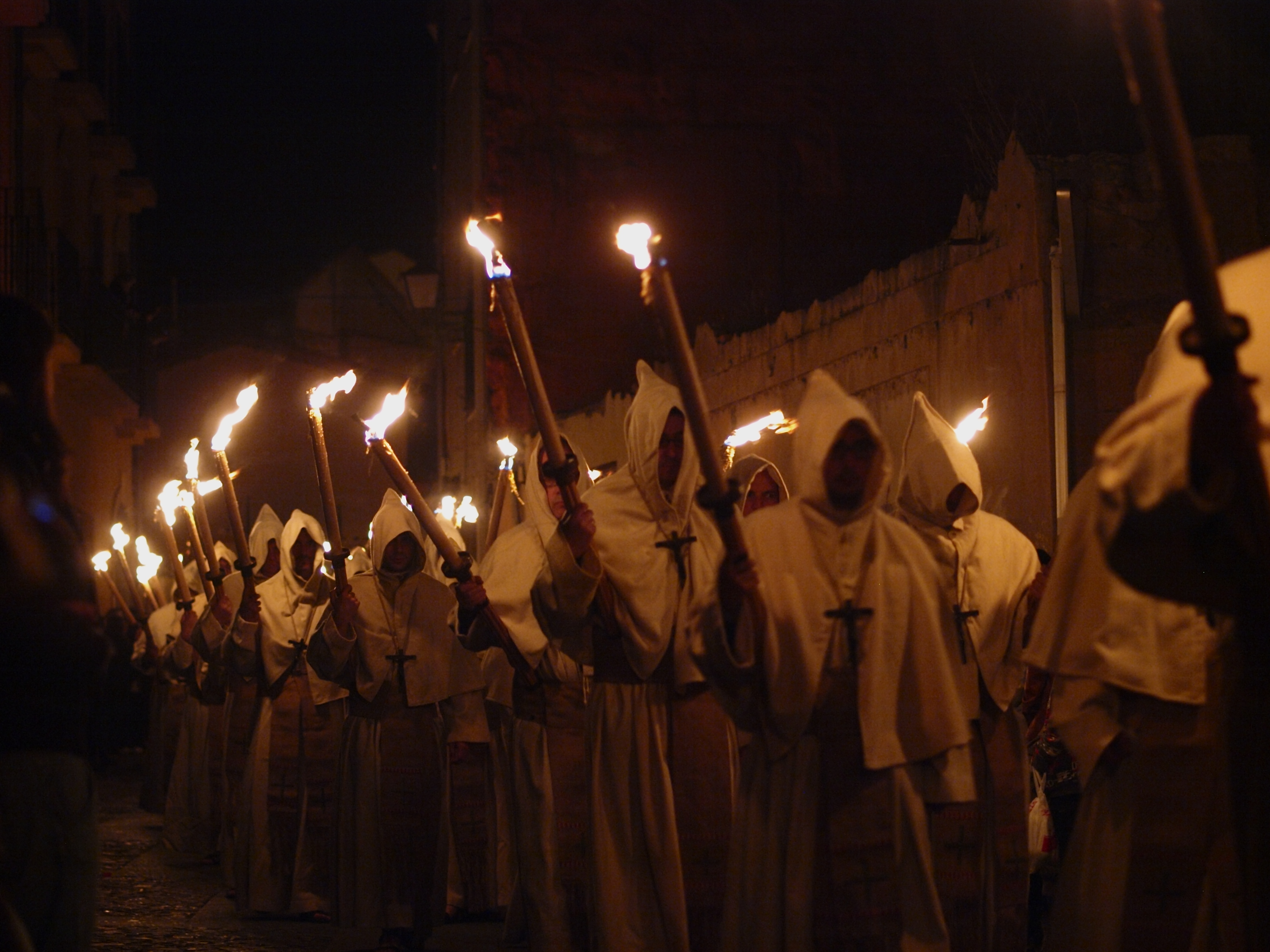
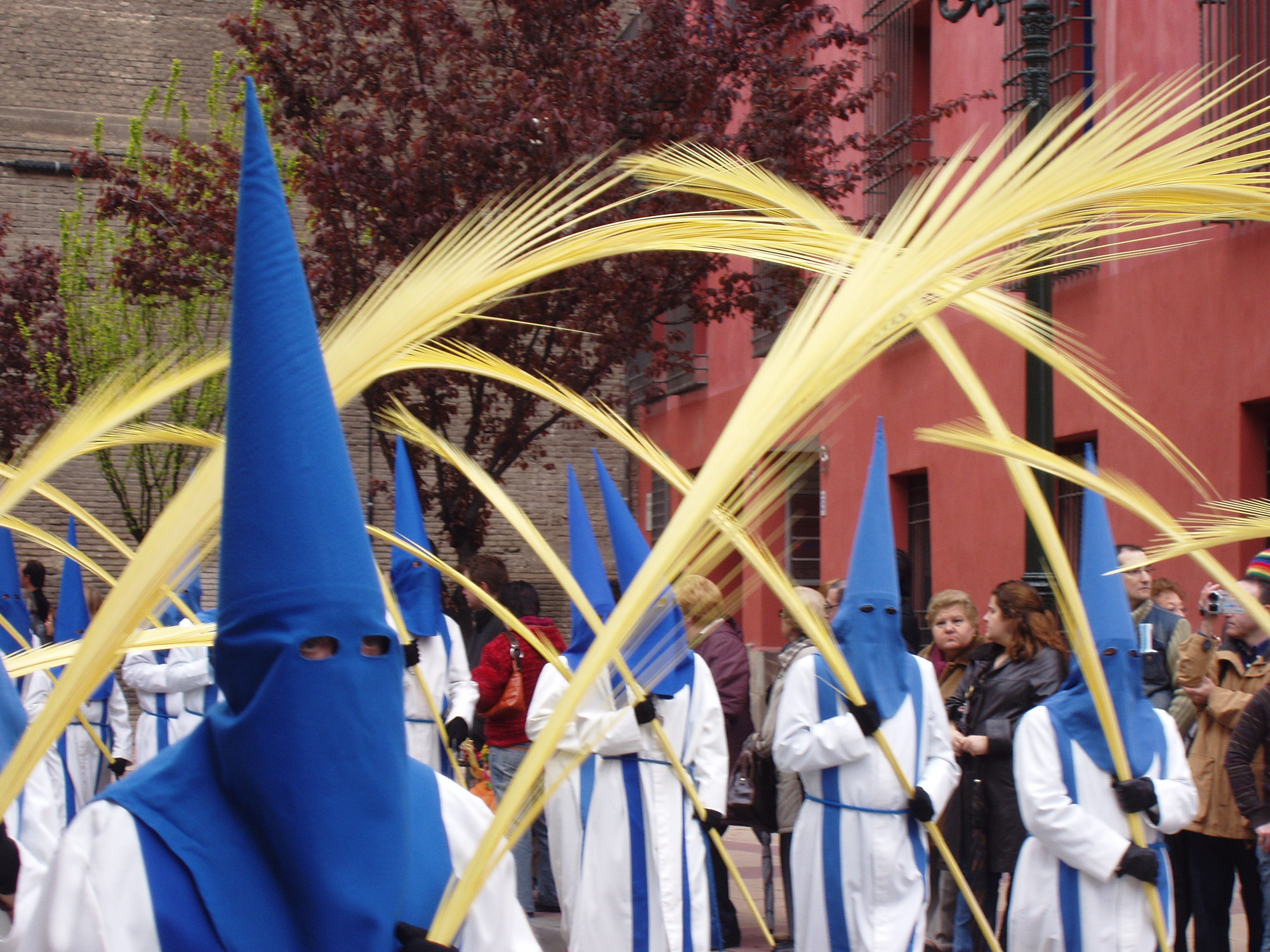
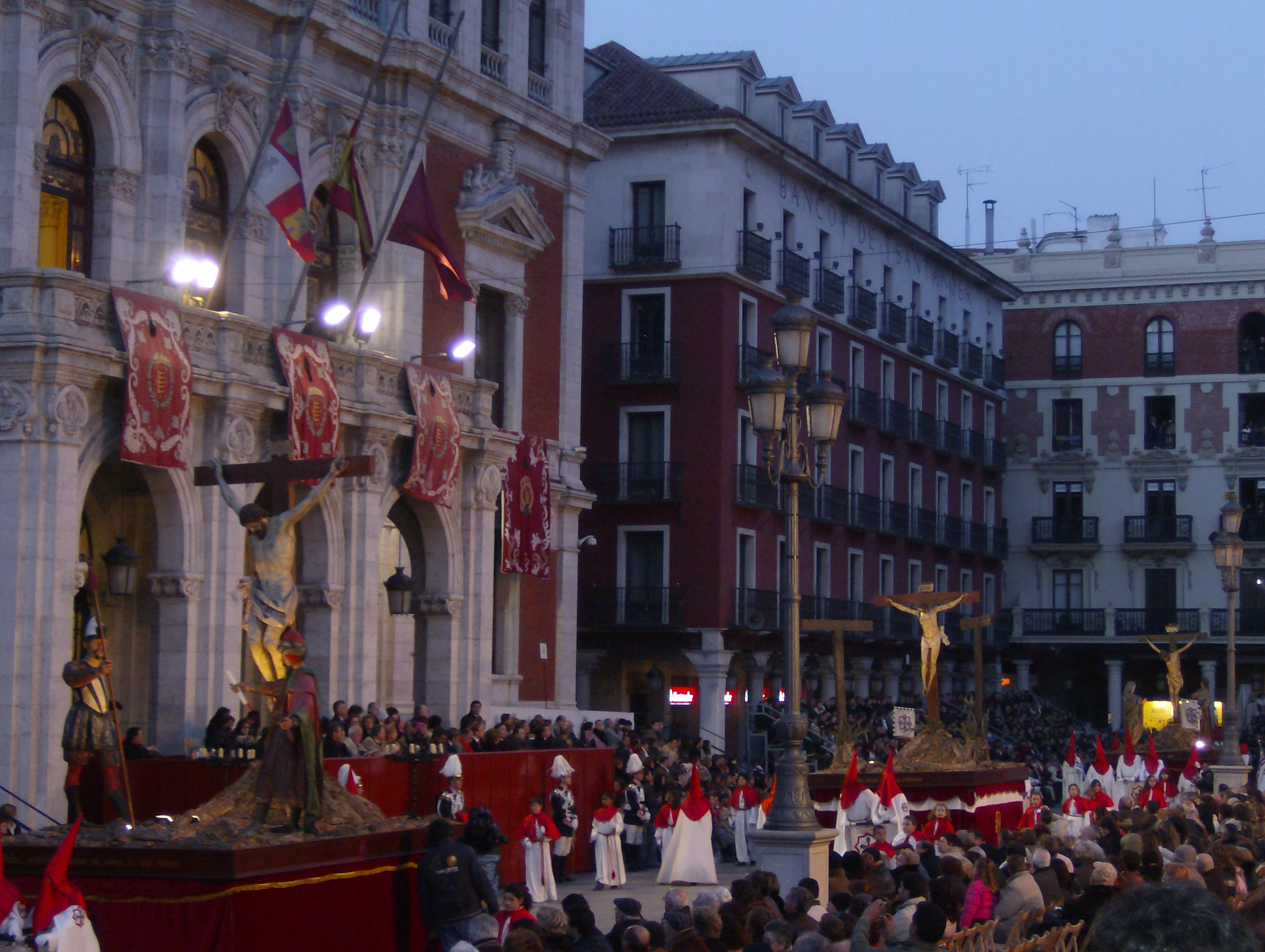
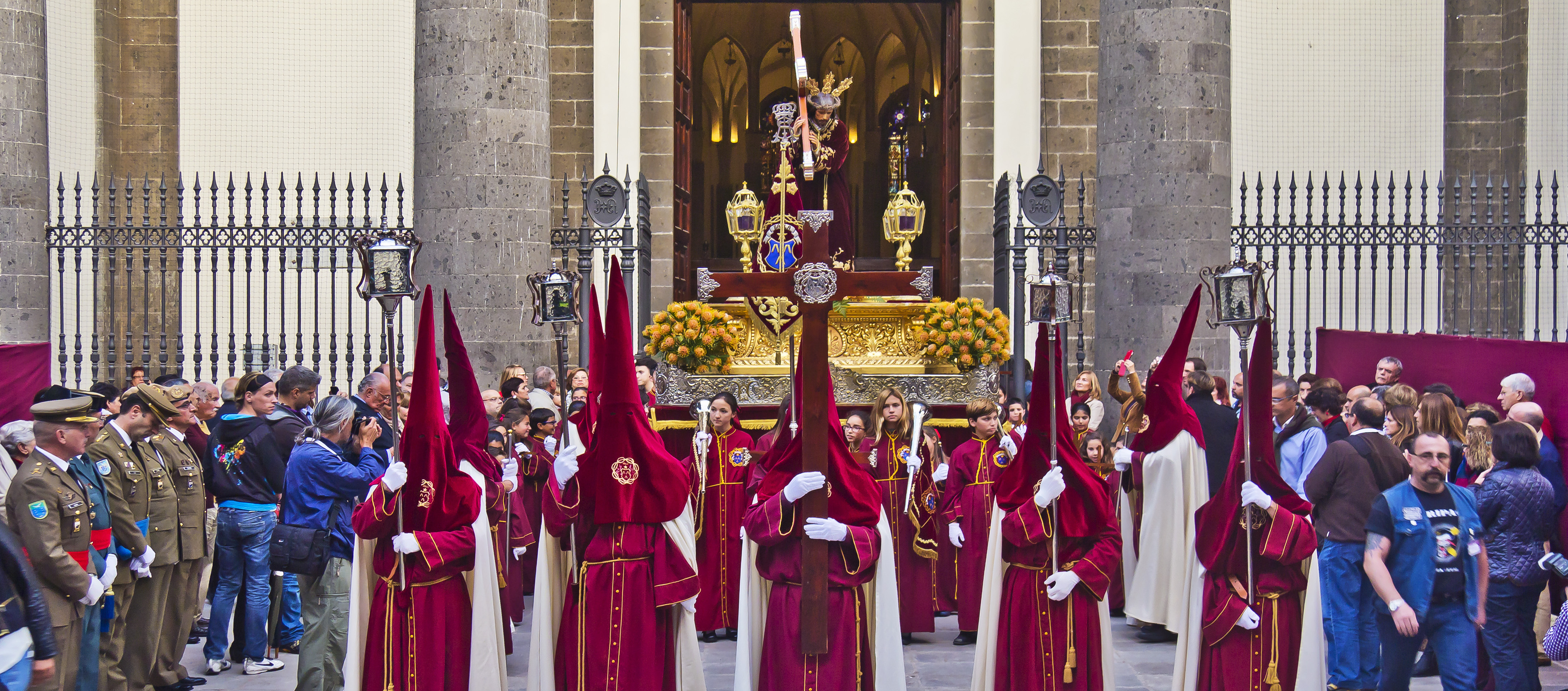
- The distinctive cloaks and hoods (capirotes) of Spanish Holy Week processions
- Official name: Semana Santa
- Observed by: Spain
- Type: Religious, Historical, Cultural
- Significance: Commemoration of the passion, death and resurrection of Jesus
- Celebrations: Processions
- Begins: Palm Sunday
- Ends: Easter Sunday
- 2025 date: April 13 - April 20
- 2026 date: March 29 - April 5
- 2027 date: March 21 - March 28
- 2028 date: April 9 - April 16
- Frequency: Annual

Holy Week (Spanish: Semana Santa; Catalan: Setmana Santa; Galician: Semana Santa; Basque: Aste Santua; Asturian: Selmana Santa; Aragonese: Semana Santa) is celebrated in Spain as the annual tribute of the Passion of Jesus Christ. It is celebrated by Catholic religious brotherhoods (Spanish: cofradías) and confraternities that perform penitential processions on the streets of almost every Spanish city and town.

== Description ==
Spain is known especially for its Holy Week traditions or Semana Santa. The celebration of Holy Week regarding popular piety relies almost exclusively on the processions of the brotherhoods or fraternities. These associations have their origins in the Middle Ages, but a number of them were created during the Baroque Period, inspired by the Counter-Reformation and also during the 20th and 21st centuries. Membership is usually open to any Catholic person and family tradition is an important element to become a member or "brother" (hermano).

Some major differences between Spanish regions are perceivable in these processions: Holy Week sees its most glamorous celebrations in Andalucía, especially in Jerez de la Frontera, Granada, Málaga and Sevilla, while those of Castilla y León see the more sombre and solemn processions in Zamora, León and Valladolid.

A common feature in Spain is the almost general usage of the nazareno or penitential robe for some of the participants in the processions. This garment consists of a tunic, a hood with conical tip (capirote) used to conceal the face of the wearer, and sometimes a cloak. The exact colors and forms of these robes depend on the particular procession. The robes were widely used in the medieval period for penitents, who could demonstrate their penance while still masking their identity. These nazarenos carry processional candles or rough-hewn wooden crosses, may walk the city streets barefoot, and, in some places may carry shackles and chains on their feet as penance. In some areas, sections of the participants wear dress freely inspired by the uniforms of the Roman legion.

The other common feature is that every brotherhood carries magnificent Pasos or floats with sculptures that depict different scenes from the gospels related to the Passion of Christ or the Sorrows of Virgin Mary. Many of these floats are art pieces created by Spanish artists such as Gregorio Fernández, Juan de Mesa y Velasco, Juan Martínez Montañés or Mariano Benlliure y Gil. Brotherhoods have owned and preserved these "pasos" for centuries in some cases. Usually, the "pasos" are accompanied by marching bands performing "marchas procesionales", a specific type of composition devoted to the images and the confraternities.

=== Tourism ===
The Holy Week is not only a religious, cultural and social event but a touristic one. Many visitors from inside and outside Spain travel to attend the crowded processions. Every year, many hand guides are released, including timetables, routes and pasos of every procession so visitors can easily follow the celebrations.

The General Secretariat of Tourism of the Ministry of Industry and Tourism of the Government of Spain grants the honorary distinction of Fiesta of International Tourist Interest to those celebrations with international projection and they are promoted in major international fairs, television and press. The Secretariat also grant the distinction of Fiesta of National Tourist Interest at the national level and the different regional governments also grant similar distinctions at the regional level.

=== Art ===
Many Spanish artists have included, recreated or used the Holy Week as a background in their creations, such as paintings, music, literature or movies, reflecting the cultural and social importance of these events. Painter Zuloaga, writers Antonio Machado and Federico García Lorca, composer Joaquin Turina and filmmaker Mateo Gil are some examples.

== By region ==
=== Andalucía ===
External videos
- https://www.youtube.com/watch?v=HmxyF5QbA-w

Among Holy Week celebrations in Andalucía, Málaga (1980), Granada (2009), and Sevilla (1980) are declared of International Tourist Interest. Holy Week in Jerez de la Frontera (1993), Cabra (1989), Ríogordo (1997), Baena (2001) and Almería (2017) are of National Tourist Interest. In another Range are those declared only of Tourist Interest by the Secretary of State of the Government of Spain, which falls within the Holy Week of Arcos de la Frontera (1980), Puente Genil (1980), Baeza (1980), Úbeda (1980), Jaén (1981) and Huércal-Overa (1983). At the next level comes the turn of those declared of Regional Tourist Interest by the Andalusian Government, which are Córdoba, Écija, Ayamonte, Antequera, Castro del Río, Marchena, Huelva, Utrera, Lucena and dozens of other Andalusian municipalities.

==== Almería ====
There are, in total, 26 brotherhoods in Almería and "pre-brotherhoods". The most important brotherhoods are; "La Estrella" "Prendimiento" and "Estudiantes". The Holy Week in Almería was declared of National Tourist Interest in 2017.

==== Cádiz ====
Cádiz's Holy Week has an artistic heritage stemming from important sculptors such as Miguel Láinez Capote and Jacinto Pimentel, incorporating the special importance of Genoese imagery. The 31 brotherhoods of the city march along streets of the historic center among 18th-century style buildings. When carrying their floats, the brotherhoods of Cádiz use a shoulder-to-shoulder technique which is unique from other locations.

==== Jerez de la Frontera ====
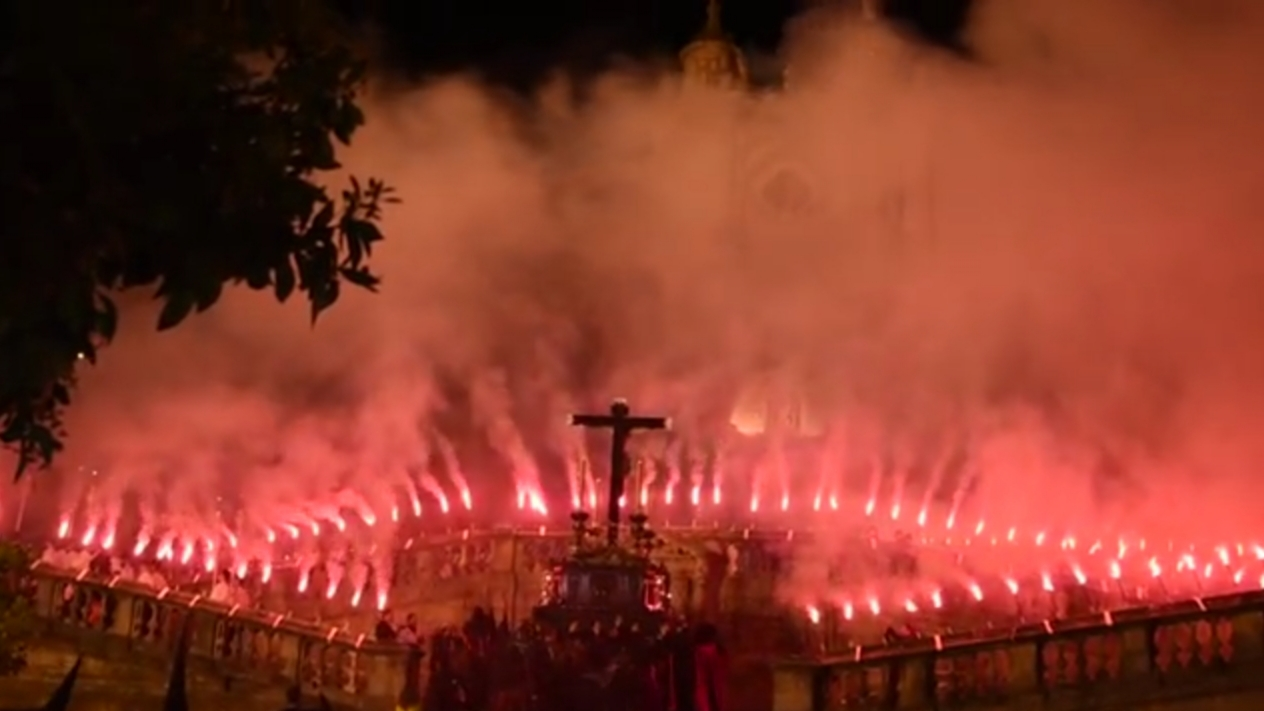
Holy Week in Jerez de la Frontera

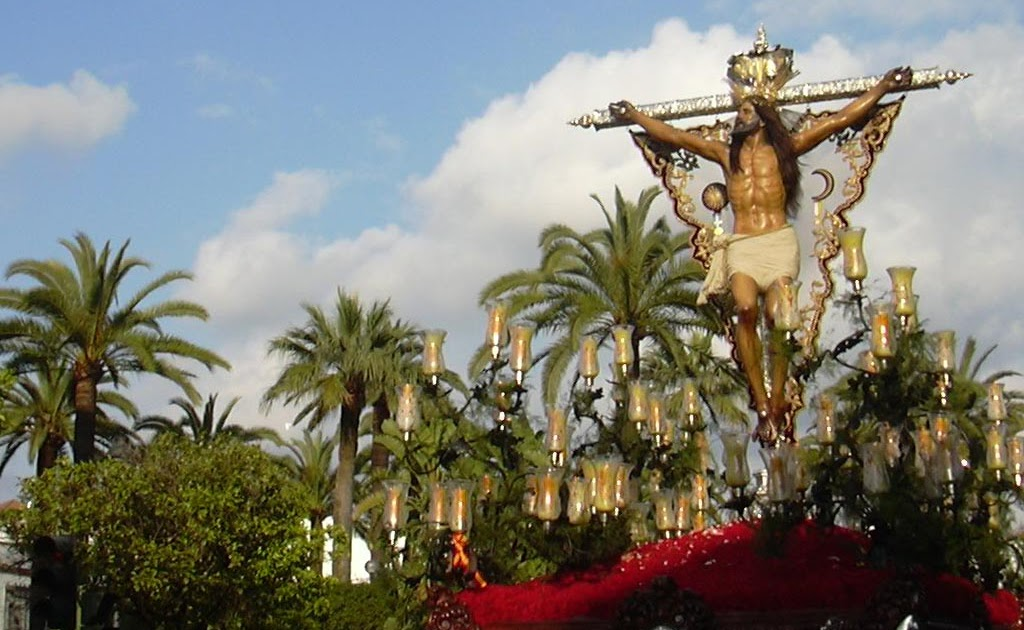
Holy Week in Jerez de la Frontera

The Holy Week of Jerez de la Frontera stands out for being one of the most important in Andalusia in terms of number of brotherhoods, quality in its carvings and iconographic sets. Its forty-five brotherhoods of penance fill the week from the Saturday of Passion to Easter Sunday with content befitting the historical roots of the celebration. Holy Week in Jerez de la Frontera has a rich historical and artistic cultural heritage since the most renowned image makers, carvers, goldsmiths and embroiderers of recent centuries have contributed to making it, leaving behind a large legacy.

Every year it has corners dedicated to the saeta, which catalyses cultural heritage and allows an understanding of the art of . This results in a Holy Week with its own idiosyncrasy, which unites imagery, and a collection of artifacts, many come from the first Sevillian processional school. Since then it has been renovated, the final destination in Jerez.

The brotherhoods arrive at the Cathedral by an official route. Jerez de la Frontera has the longest official route in Spain, 1.3 km (0.81 mi). Jerez de la Frontera has its own Diocese, independent of that of Cádiz-Ceuta, so although it belongs to the province of Cádiz, it must be studied individually as another Diocese. The Holy Week in Jerez was declared of National Tourist Interest in 1993.

==== Córdoba ====
Córdoba holds one of the most popular Holy Weeks in Andalusia. Thirty-seven brotherhoods take part in processions with elaborate "pasos" which represents the scenes of the events of The Passion of Christ.

==== Granada ====
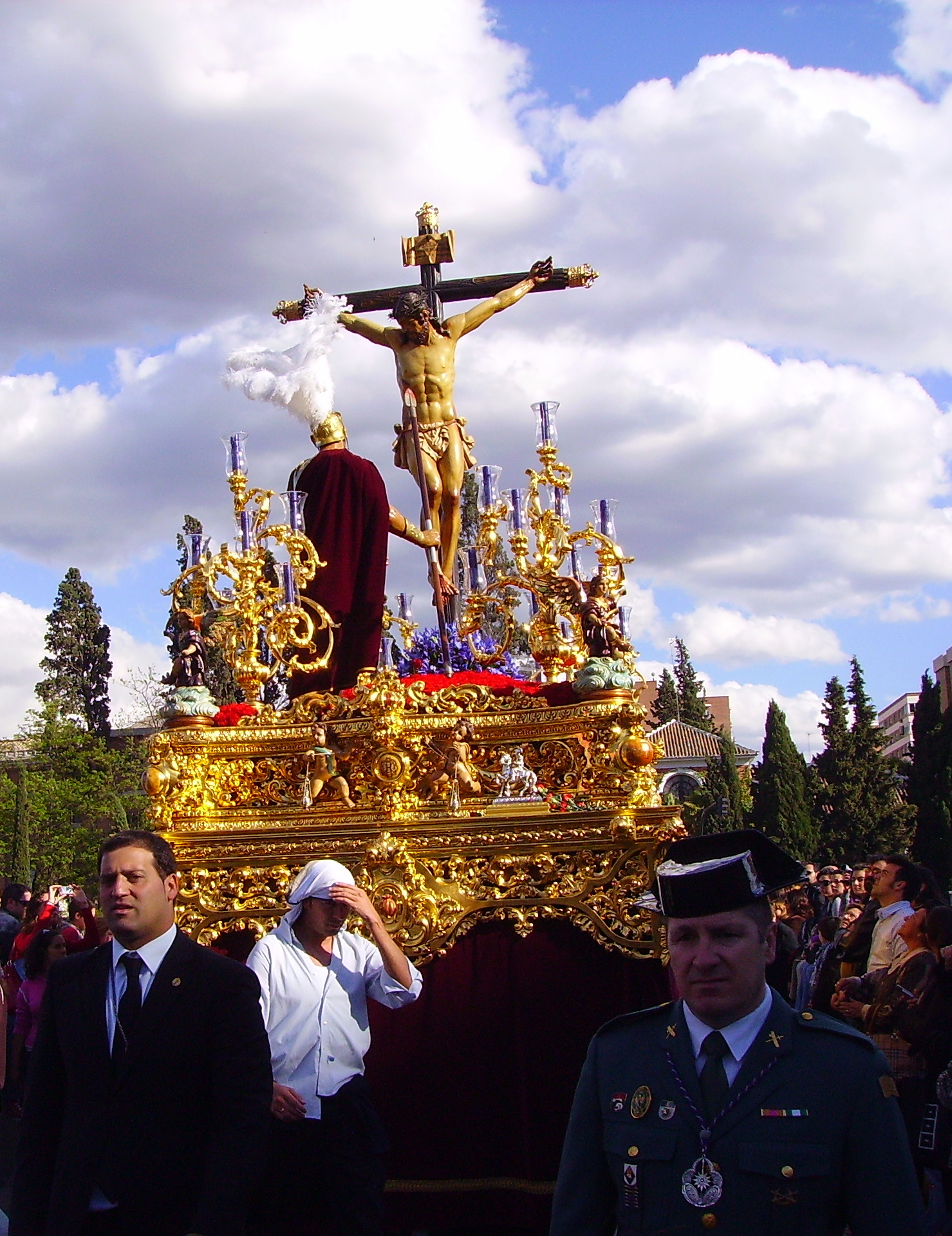
Holy Week procession in Granada.

Although there were processions from Granada in the 16th and 17th centuries, it was at the beginning of the 20th century when this tradition was extended and consolidated. Thirty-two fraternities and thirty-four Nazarene courts participate. The Royal Federation of Brotherhoods and Brotherhoods of Granada is the body in charge of the regulation of the set of brotherhoods of the city.

In this city Christian brotherhoods and institutions were created from the taking of Granada in 1492. The processions will be extended in the sixteenth century with the Counter-Reformation and there will also be some in the XVII. However, the bulk of the brotherhoods they were founded from the beginning of the 20th century.

At the beginning of the 20th century, the archbishop's support and the resurgence of the local bourgeoisie led to a boom in Holy Week. This revival began in 1996 with the procession of the Holy Great Burial. In the 1920s, seven new churches were founded brotherhoods of penance. In 1927 the Federation of Brotherhoods of Granada was created, in a similar way to the Association of Brotherhoods of Málaga created in 1921.

In 1936 Federico García Lorca wrote a narrative for Unión Radio about Holy Week in Granada. Since 1970 this tradition has suffered a certain decline, although it will recover from 1977. It was declared of International Tourist Interest in 2009.

==== Málaga ====
Over 500 years, Holy Week of Málaga has been constantly present in the religious and popular feeling of people from Málaga. The Holy Week religious celebrations in Málaga are famous countrywide. Processions start on Palm Sunday and continue until Easter Sunday with the most dramatic and solemn on Maundy Thursday and Good Friday. Images from the Passion on huge ornate "tronos" (floats or thrones) some weighing more than 5,000 kg (11,000 lb) and carried by more than 250 members of Nuestra Señora de la Esperanza, shape the processions that go through the streets with penitents dressed in long purple robes, often with pointed hats, followed by women in black carrying candles. Drums and trumpets play solemn music and occasionally someone spontaneously sings a mournful saeta dedicated to the floats as it makes its way slowly round the streets.

The Baroque taste of the religious brotherhoods and associations, along with the great amount of processional materials that they have been accumulating for centuries, result in a street stage of exuberant art, full of color and majesty. Many brotherhoods were affected by the burning churches in 1931 and an important part of their heritage was destroyed (i.e. trousseaus, imagery, and other equipment) during the Spanish Civil War. In the years following it, revival was slow but it recovered with much greater numbers than before. Also, by the 1970s, Cofradías nuevas began to be formed in the city, and some old brotherhoods which had been forgotten, were reorganized by young people as: Salud, Descendimiento, Monte Calvario and many more others to adapt to the changing times.

Holy Week (Semana Santa) in Málaga features processions in which large processional floats known as tronos carry religious images through the streets. These processions include thousands of penitents (nazarenos) wearing traditional robes and carrying candles, accompanied by bands performing processional marches. Incense and flowers are commonly used, and substantial crowds assemble along the routes to observe the processions.

Holy Week in Málaga is very different from that celebrated in other Andalusian or Spanish places, and those who go to Málaga for the first time will be surprised, as the Passion Week there is not lived with meditation and silence, but it is full of happiness, noise, cheer, spontaneous saetas (flamenco verses sung at the processions) and applause as the images pass by.

Some tronos (floats) of Holy Week of Málaga are so huge that they must be housed in other places different from the churches, as they are taller than the entrance doors: real walking chapels of over 5,000 kilos carried by dozens of bearers. There are also military parades playing processional marches or singing their anthems along the route. All of this does not imply a lack of religiosity (nor the opposite though, since not few of the participants consider themselves lapsed catholics), but it is just the particular way that many people from Málaga live their faith, folkloric gustoes and/or feelings during the Holy Week. One of these military celebrations is that of the Spanish Legion, which parades the image of Christ of the Good Death together with the Legion's own military band and Honor guard on Maundy Thursday, very popular among tourists, locals, and military veterans. It was declared of International Tourist Interest in 1980.

==== Seville ====
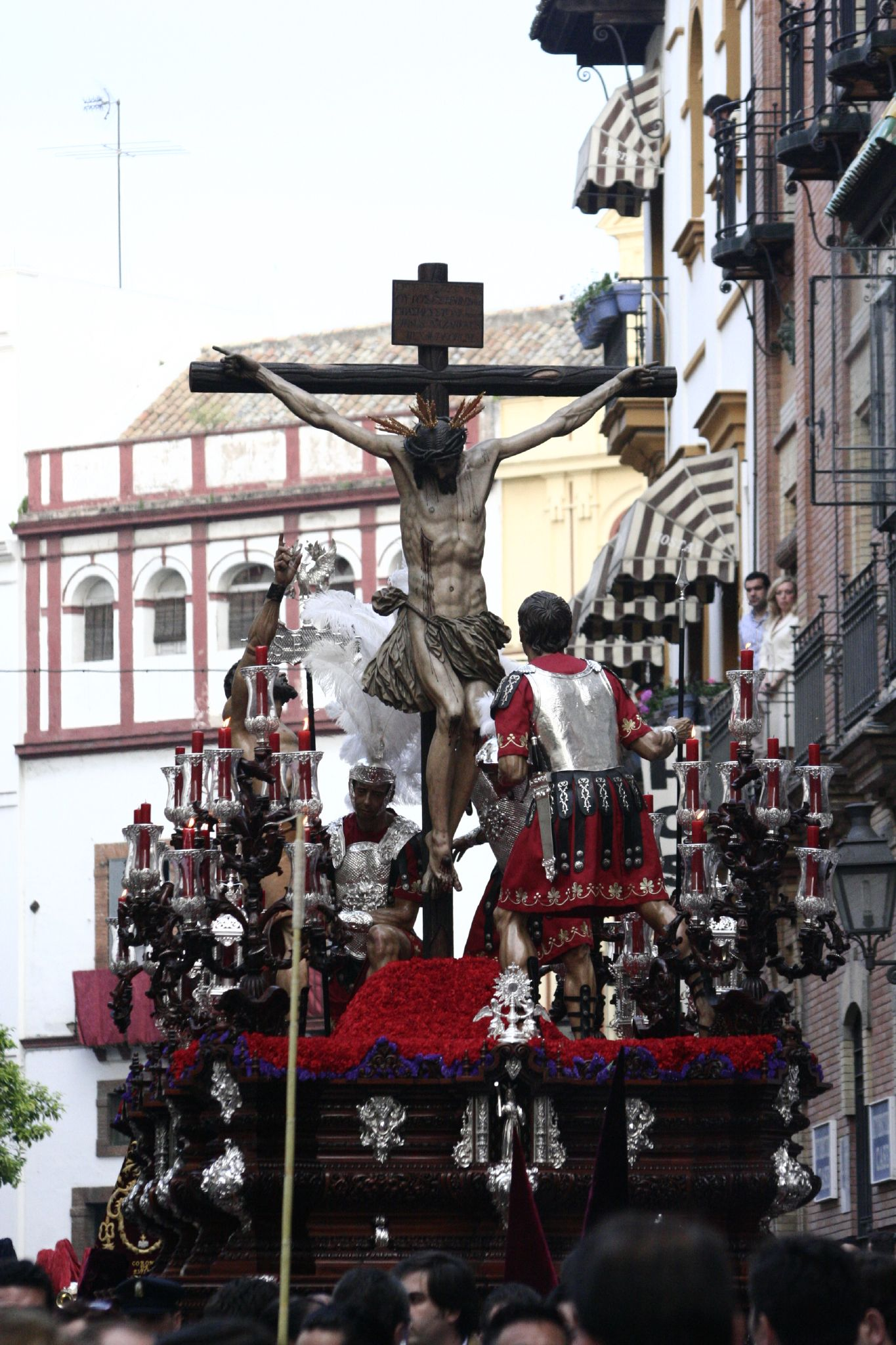
Holy Week procession in Seville

Seville arguably holds some of the most elaborate processions for Holy Week. The tradition dates from Counter Reformation times, or even earlier. The "Semana Santa de Sevilla" is notable for featuring the procession of "pasos", lifelike painted wooden sculptures of individual scenes of the events that happened between Jesus' entry in Jerusalem and his burial, or images of the Virgin Mary showing restrained grief for the torture and killing of her son. Some of the images are artistic masterworks of great antiquity. These "pasos" (which usually weigh over a metric ton) are physically carried on the neck of costaleros (literally "sack men", for their distinctive -and functional- headdress). The "costaleros" (from twenty-four to forty-eight) are hidden inside the platform of the "paso", so it seems to walk alone. Historically dock workers were hired to carry the "pasos". From 1973 onward, that task has been universally taken over by the members of the confraternities who organize each procession. It was declared of International Tourist Interest in 1980.

==== Jaén ====
The tradition of celebrating the Holy Week in Jaén started in the Middle Ages, and nowadays it has been declared "Bien de Interés Turístico-Cultural Andaluz" since 2006 and "Fiesta de Interés Turístico Nacional de Andalucía". From Palm Sunday until Resurrection Sunday 17 catholic brotherhoods carry out their processions through the streets of Jaén.

=== Castile and León ===
==== León ====
Artículo principal:Semana Santa en León

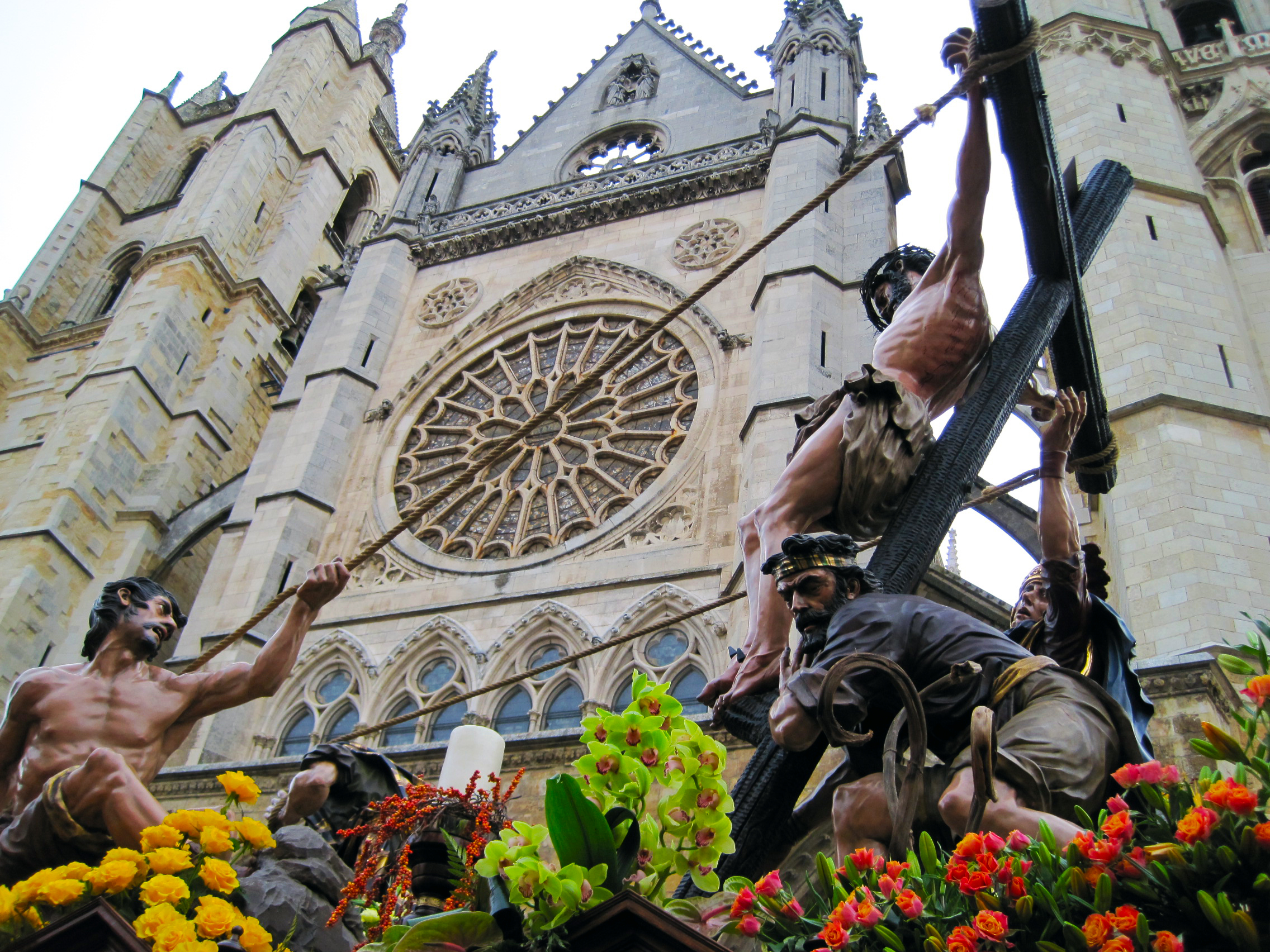
Paso de La Exaltación de la Cruz. León (Spain).

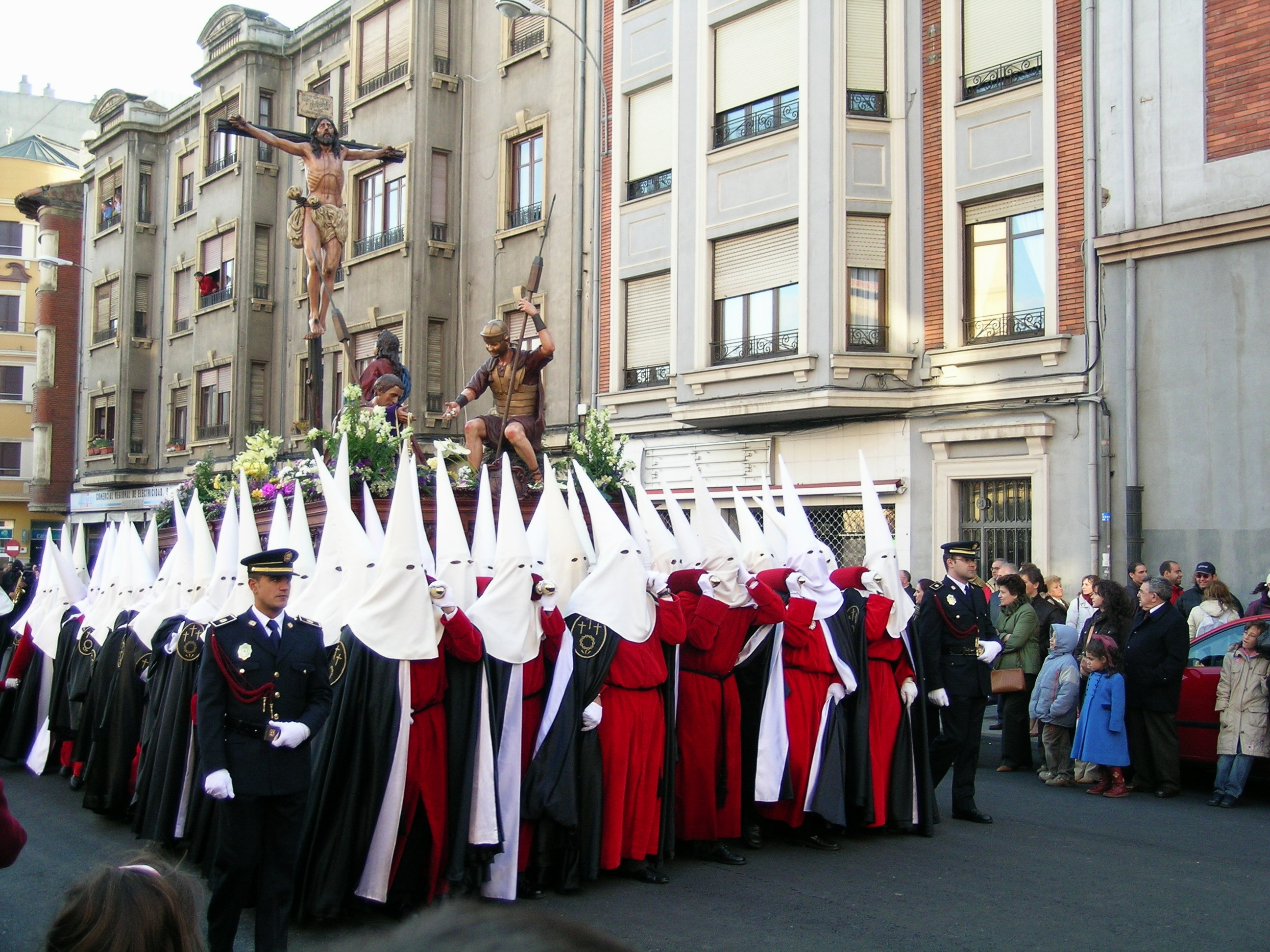
Holy Week in León.

Holy Week processions in León were declared of International Tourist Interest in 2002. It has attracted more than 15,000 penitents on the streets with processions beginning on Passion Friday (the Friday before Holy Week) and lasting until Easter Sunday. The most and famous procession is the "Procesion de los Pasos", also known as the "Procesion del Encuentro" (Procession of the Meeting). During this nine-hour procession, about 4,000 penitents carry thirteen "pasos" around all the city. The most solemn moment is El Encuentro (The Meeting) when the pasos representing Saint John and La Dolorosa face one to the other and are "bailados" (penitents move the paso as if Saint John and La Dolorosa were dancing).

An anti-clerical procession, the "Burial of Genarín", celebrating drunkenness is held on Thursday in Holy Week.

==== Salamanca ====
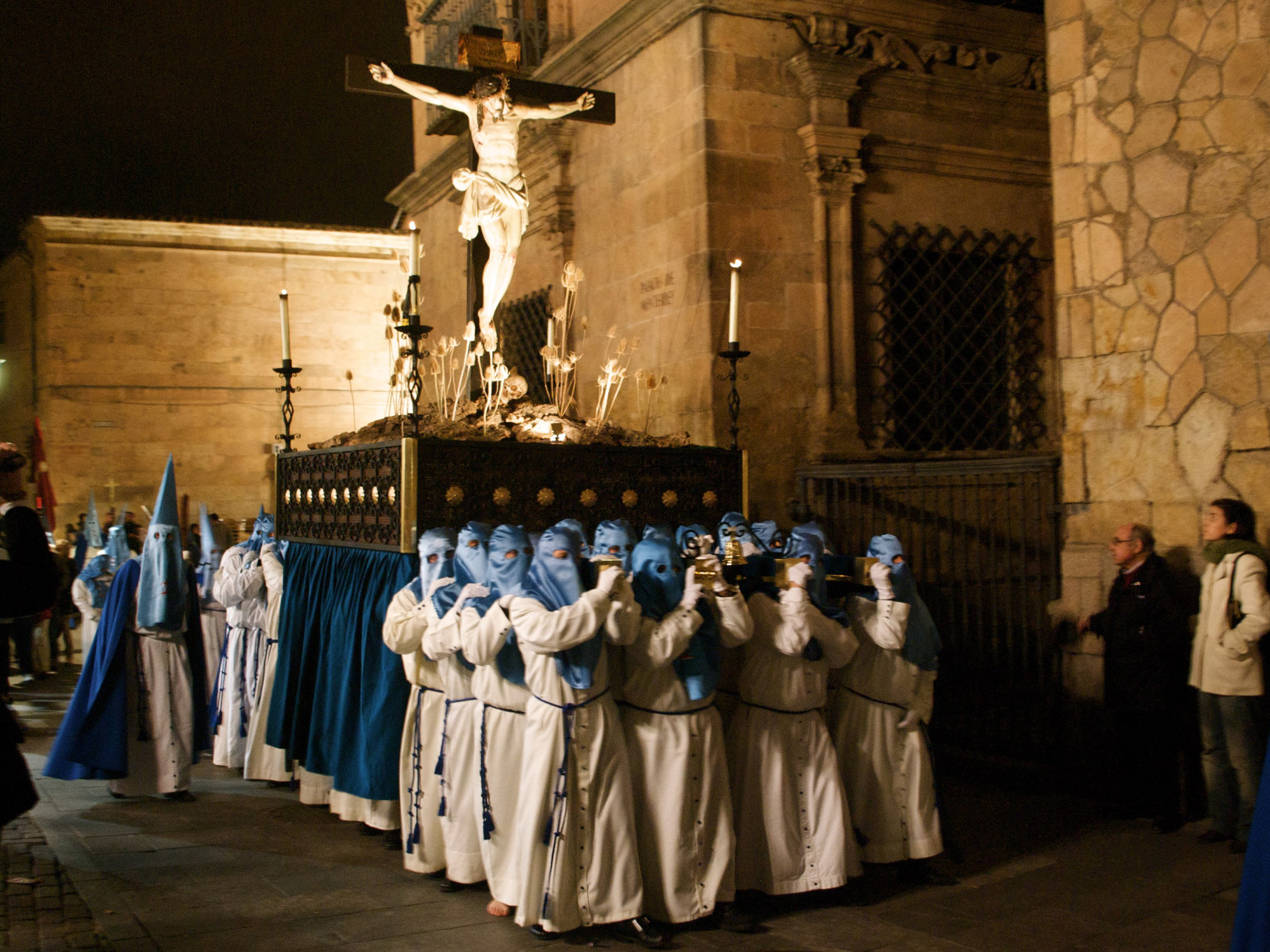
Paso of Holy Week in Salamanca.

Salamanca has one of the oldest celebrations in Spain. The earliest penance processions can be traced back to 1240. Three are the characteristics that make Holy Week in Salamanca unique: The monumental background provided by the Old City, declared UNESCO World Heritage Site in 1988, the quality of the images and pasos, created by important Spanish artist such as Luis Salvador Carmona or Mariano Benlliure and the links with the University of Salamanca, the oldest institution of its kind in the country.

10,000 penitents associated to eighteen brotherhoods organize twenty-four processions that walk the streets of the center carrying forty-three pasos from Friday of Sorrows to Easter Sunday. The Holy Week in Salamanca was declared of International Tourist Interest in 2003.

==== Valladolid ====
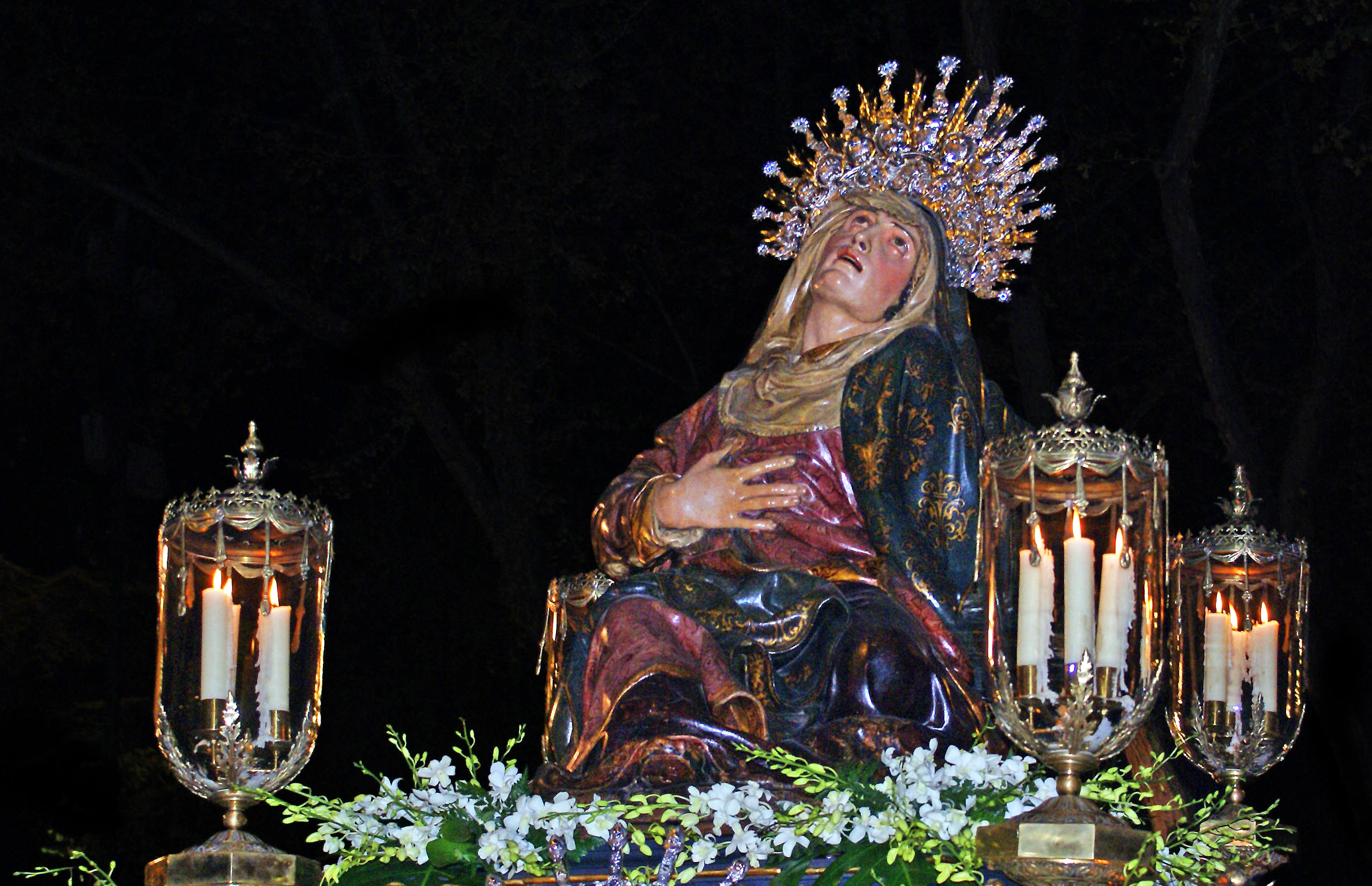
Virgen de las Angustias by Juan de Juni.

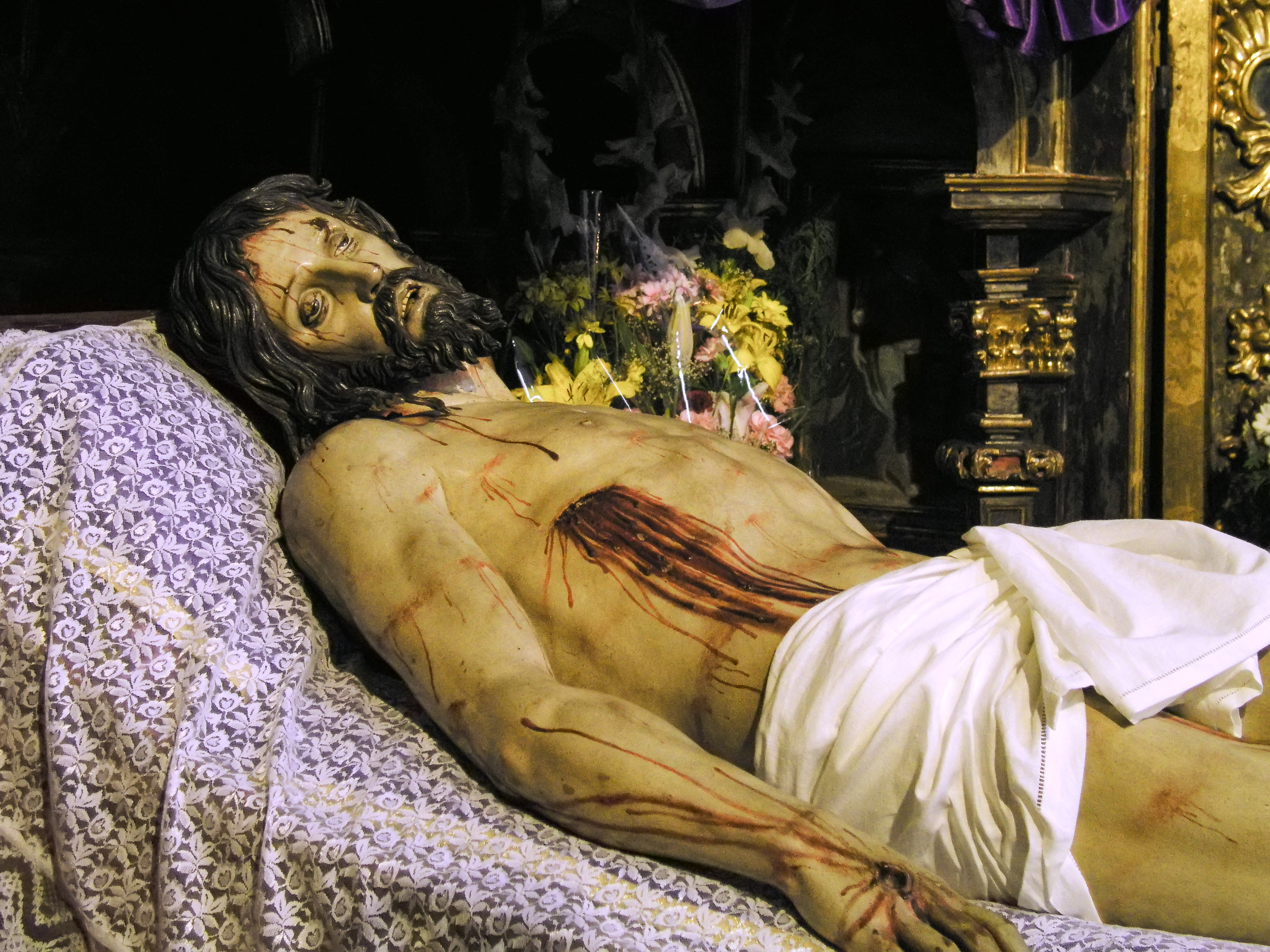
"Lying Christ" by Gregorio Fernández.

The Holy Week in Valladolid holds one of the best known Catholic traditions in Valladolid. The Good Friday processions are considered an exquisite and rich display of Castilian religious sculpture. On this day, in the morning, members of the brotherhoods on horseback make a poetic proclamation throughout the city. The "Sermon of the Seven Words" is spoken in Plaza Mayor Square. In the afternoon, thousands of people take part in the Passion Procession, comprising thirty-one pasos (religious statues), most of which date from the 16th and 17th centuries, by artists like Juan de Juni or Gregorio Fernández. The last statue in the procession is the Virgen de las Angustias, and her return to the church is one of the most emotional moments of the celebrations, with the Salve Popular sung in her honour.

Holy Week is one of the most spectacular and emotional fiestas in Valladolid. Religious devotion, art, colour and music combine in acts to commemorate the death of Jesus Christ: the processions. Members of the different Easter brotherhoods, dressed in their characteristic robes, parade through the streets carrying religious statues (pasos) to the sound of drums and music.

The National Sculpture Museum of the city gives a total of 104 images (distributed in the corresponding pasos) to the processions, such as fact museum unique in Spain. As a reflection of its importance, is considered a Fiesta of International Tourist Interest since 1981.

==== Zamora ====
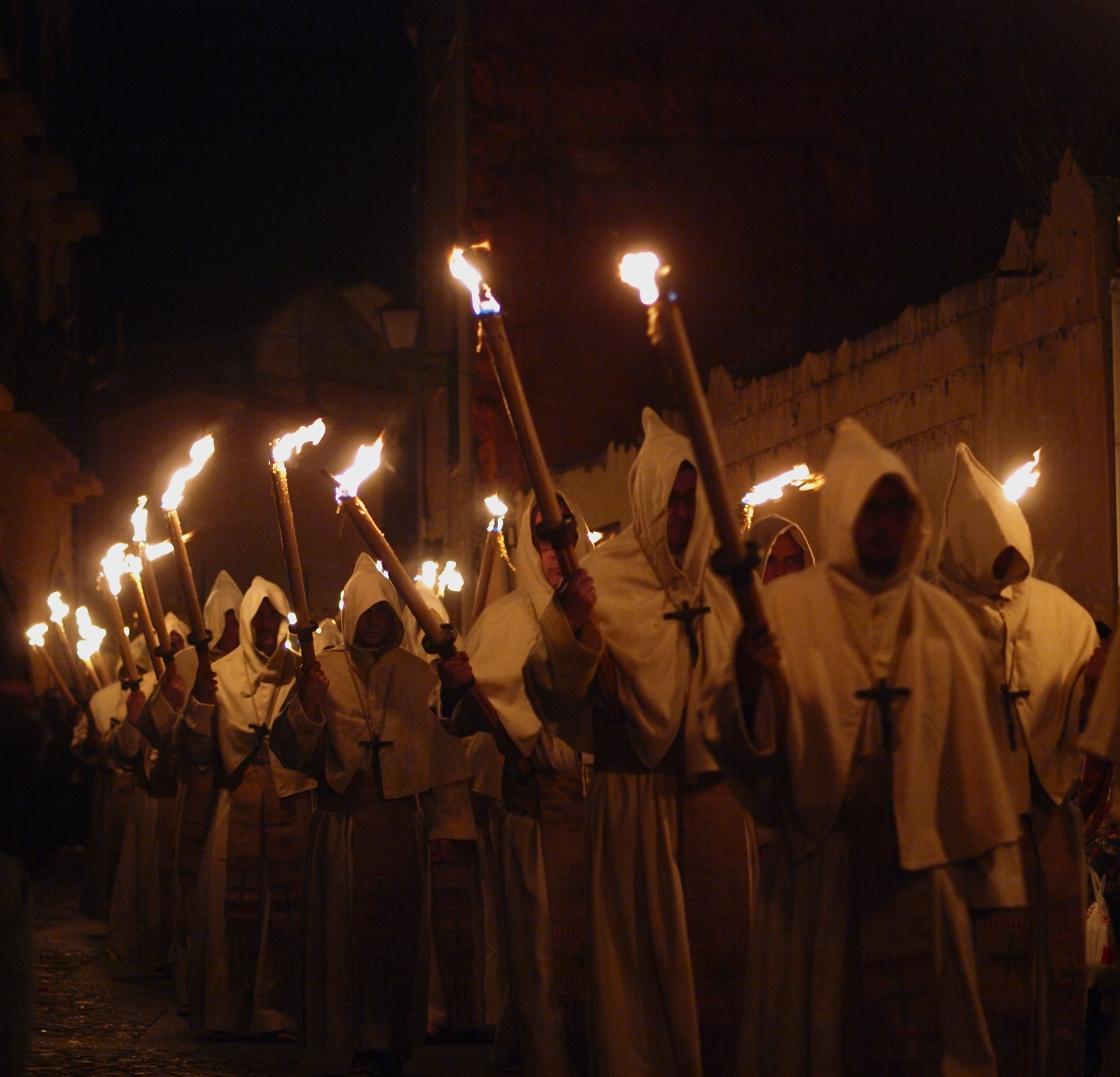
Holy Week procession in Zamora

Zamora has the oldest celebrations in Spain. The earliest penance processions can be traced back to 1179. Holy Week in Zamora is celebrated by sixteen sisterhoods and fraternities that perform seventeen penance processions on the streets of the old city. Thousands of penitents walk the streets while the processions are attended by a crowd of locals and visitors. Zamora increases its population five times, up to 300,000 people during the festival.

The singularities of this celebration include the medieval set up of some of the parades where the brotherhoods use monk´s robes instead of the most usual nazareno´s conical hat, torch fire instead of candles or male choirs instead of marching bands. The Holy Week in Zamora was declared of International Tourist Interest in 1986.

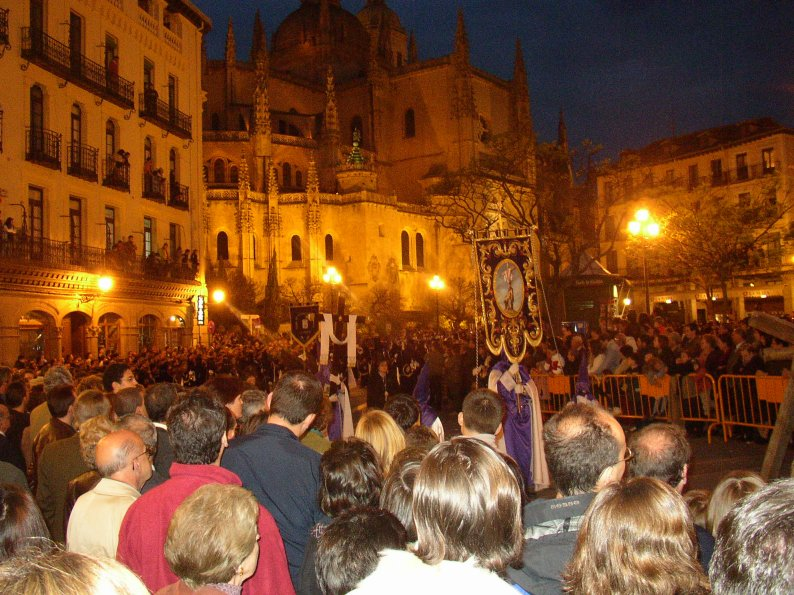
Main square of Segovia during a procession

==== Segovia ====
The Holy Week in Segovia is the biggest cultural, religious and turistical event that happens in the city of Segovia. The earliest signs of this kind of celebration dates back to 1534, after the appointment of Julián Miranda Bistuer as bishop of the city in 1905, the Holy Week in Segovia was completely reorganized, incorporating several new floats and creating the current "Procesión de los pasos", a procession in which all the brotherhoods of the city march together from the cathedral to the acueduct. Currently there are 10 brotherhoods in the city. The Holy Week in Segovia was declared of National Tourist Interest in 2017.

=== Region of Murcia ===
==== Cartagena ====
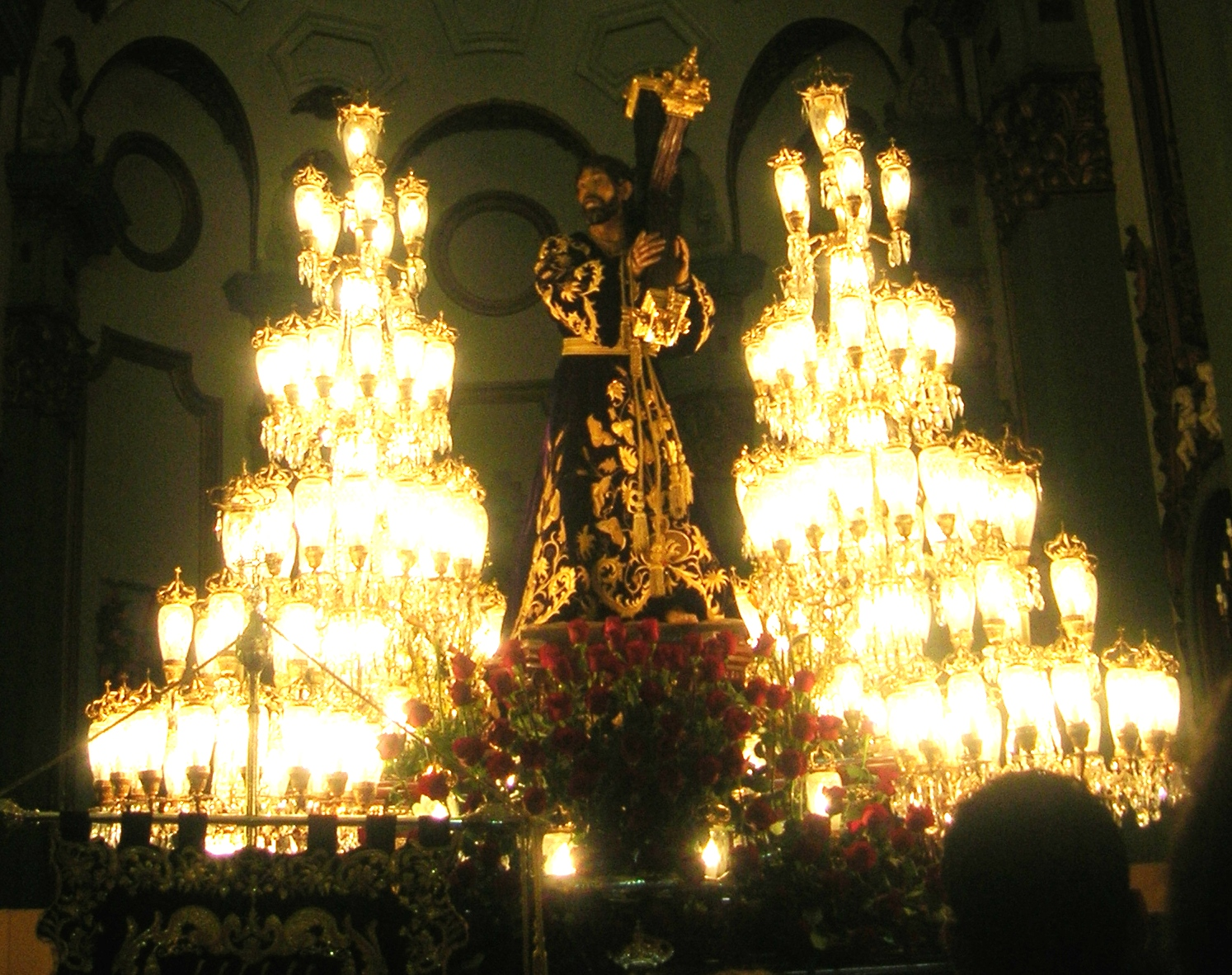
Holy Friday. Throno of Nuestro Padre Jesús Nazareno. (Cofradía Marraja. Cartagena)

Cartagena is home to the first of the Holy Week processions in Spain, on the Friday before Holy Week. The processions in Cartagena do not closely resemble others in Spain due to their strict order due to Cartagena's naval heritage.

The processions are organised by four brotherhoods, wearing different colours, with different devotions and in charge of different processions. The largest two brotherhoods, the Marrajos and Californios, have a large charitable presence in the city and are divided into smaller groups ("agrupaciones"), each in charge of one of the floats in the procession. The members of the group are all clad in the same colours.

The processional images include works by classic artists such as Francisco Salzillo, José Capuz, Mariano Benlliure, Juan González Moreno or Federico Coullaut-Valera as well as contemporary sculptors. Unlike in other cities, in Cartagena the order of the floats in the procession follows the chronological order of the events narrated in the Gospels.

Also unique in Cartagena are the infantry companies ("piquetes") at the rear of the main processions, escorting the float of the Virgin Mary which. Due to Cartagena's role as a naval base, Spanish Navy Marines send a delegation on Holy Tuesday (californios) and Holy Friday (marrajos). For its part, the 73rd Artillery Regiment participates as a picket in the Holy Wednesday (californios) and Easter Sunday (resucitados) processions. This regiment also accompanies the throne of Christ of the Lance in the Holy Friday procession (marrajos).

Multi layered thrones with electric lighting became known as "Cartagena style thrones" that were made possible due to the mining boom in the area in the late nineteenth century.

==== Cieza ====
The Holy Week in Cieza was declared of International Tourist Interest in 2023.

==== Mula ====
The Noche de los Tambores is celebrated on Tuesday during Holy Week celebrations in Mula in Murcia, when at midnight thousands of people play the large snare drums when the bell rings, preceded by a trumpet song. Declared of National Touristic Interest, it is a tradition born after the banning of playing drums and other instruments during Holy Week celebrations out of the "procession" hours, by the Catholic local authorities in the 19th century. The snare drummers of Mula, known as "Tamboristas", continue playing on Good Friday and Easter Sunday.

==== Lorca ====
Holy Week in Lorca is one of the most important demonstrations of celebration of Holy Week in Spain. Regardless of the existence of religious processions in the traditional way, are the Bible Parades Passionate dotting the Easter lorquina of a unique and different, with representations of the Old Testament or the Christian symbolism or with the participation of horses and chariots and floats of enormous dimensions. The embroidered silk are also a prominent feature of Lorca processions, marked by an extraordinary rivalry between two of its fraternities or steps, the Blue and White.

The most important step is the Royal and Illustrious Confraternity of Our Lady of the Rosary (White Pass) is traditionally considered going back to the 15th century, although the oldest documents referring to the same date of 1599. Its owner is the virgin of bitterness known as the beautiful, which is carried on Good Friday in a golden throne carried by over 130 people. The White Pass has over 1,500 embroideries in silk and gold. The other step is Brotherhood of Farmers Lorca (blue pass). Holder is Our Lady of Sorrows, and also embroidered in silk and gold.

==== City of Murcia ====
This traditional festival portrays the events which lead up to and include the Crucifixion according to the New Testament. Life-sized, finely detailed sculptures by Francisco Salzillo (1707–1783) are removed from their museums and carried around the city in elegant processions amid flowers and, at night, candles, pausing at stations which are meant to re-enact the final moments before the crucifixion of Jesus.

==== Moratalla ====
During Holy Week in Moratalla there is a traditional tamborada, a collective drumming performance in what is known as the Drummers Festival ("Fiestas del Tambor de Moratalla"), which can last for three days (Maundy Thursday, Good Friday and Easter Sunday). In southern Spain, tamboradas are characteristic of Moratalla as well as of Mula (in Murcia) and Hellín and Tobarra (in Albacete). A unique aspect of Moratalla's Holy Week is that every tamborista (snare drummer) dresses in distinct, handmade robes and for some hoods or capiotes. The snare drums of the town, which are larger today, are also traditionally handmade with the snares made currently of similar materials as those made in Mula, which are beaten currently with special drumsticks shaped like mallets.

==== La Union ====
The Semana Santa Minera (or Mining Holy Week). During these festive days there is a parade or festive pilgrim or walk named Stations of the Cross. This act is conducted in the territories whose religion is Catholicism during the Holy Week, but the special feature of these walks in La Unión is that the statue which is carried is about an unconventional version of Christ which is dedicated to the mining and the miners, this is called 'Cristo de los mineros' (Christ of the miners). There are also other processions (organised religious and sometimes festive walkings) such as one that is held on Good Friday (The previous Friday to Eastern Monday) and another one whose name is Procesión del Santo Entierro.

=== Galicia ===
==== Ferrol ====
Ferrol's Holy Week is one of the two main celebrations of this type in Galicia. Since Palm Sunday to Easter Sunday 25 processions go over the three oldest neighborhoods of the town organized by 5 different "cofradías." This processions are composed by "tronos" which carry statues of Christ, the Virgin Mary and other saints on them. These tronos are richly adorned with golden and silver, and decorated with numerous flowers. These statues are accompanied by devotees wearing habits and capirotes and carrying candles. These people are commonly called "capuchones." Moreover, the processions are also accompanied by music played by brass bands.

During the celebrations of Ferrol's Holy Week, the town receives thousands of tourists and the environment is warm and friendly. Furthermore, a lot of complementary activities are programmed during all the week. It is a Fiesta of International Tourist Interest since 2014 and of National Tourist Interest before that, since 1995.

==== Viveiro ====
Holy Week in Viveiro is one of the best known religious events within Galicia. This week features the procession of pasos, floats of lifelike wooden sculptures of individual scenes of the events of the Passion, or images of the Virgin Mary showing restrained grief for the torture and killing of her son. Some of the sculptures are of great antiquity and are considered artistic masterpieces, as well as being culturally and spiritually important to the local Catholic population.

During Holy Week, the city is crowded with residents and visitors, drawn by the spectacle and atmosphere. The impact is particularly strong for the Catholic community. The processions are organised by hermandades and cofradías, religious brotherhoods. During the processions, members precede the pasos, dressed in penitential robes. They may also be accompanied by brass bands.

The processions work along a designated route from their home churches and chapels, usually via a central viewing area and back. As of 2011, a total of fifteen processions are scheduled for the week, from the previous Friday to Palm Sunday through to Easter Sunday morning. It has been considered an International Tourist Interest since 2013.

=== Canary Islands ===
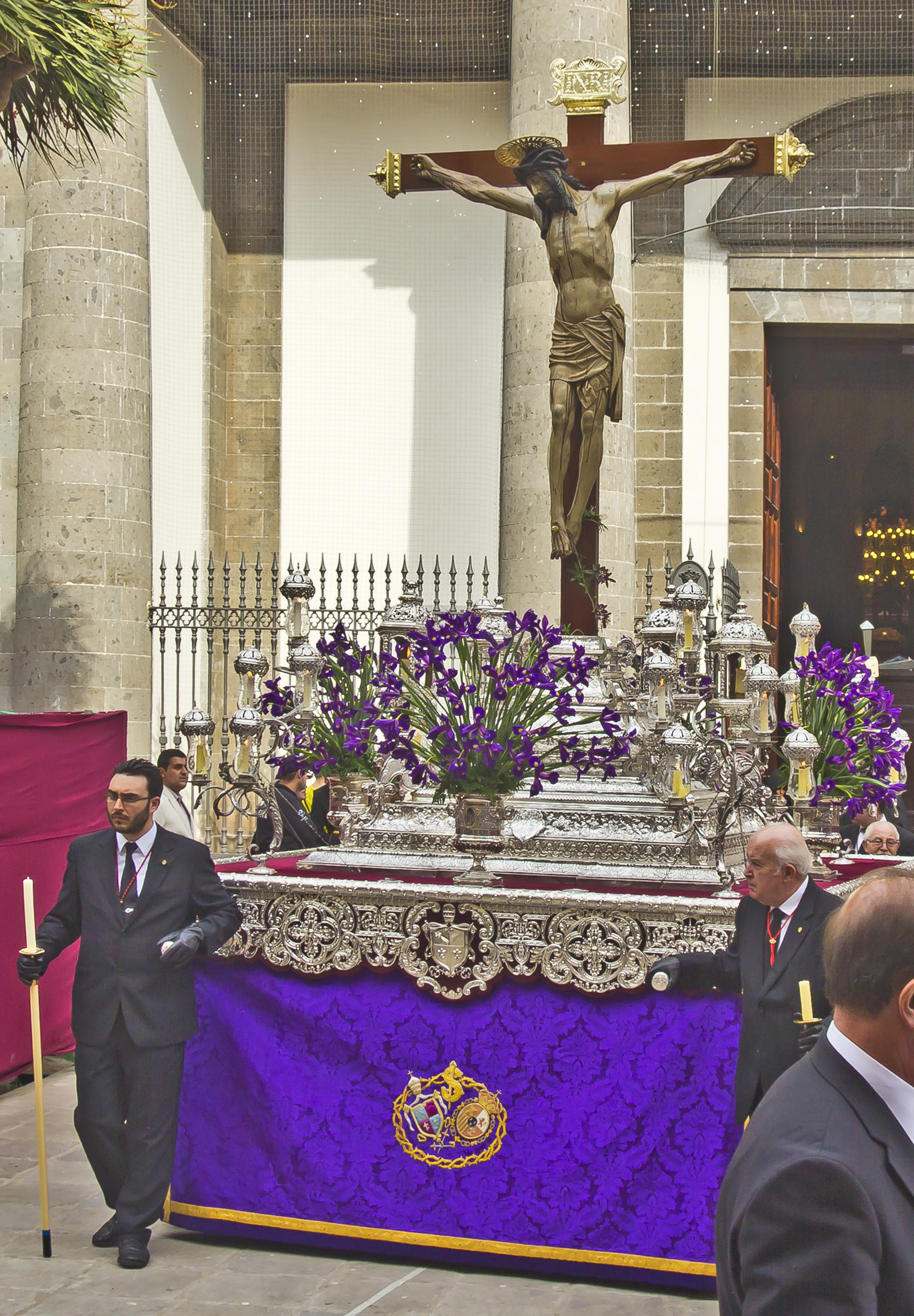
Image of the Holy Cristo de La Laguna leaving the cathedral during the Magna Procession of Good Friday.

==== San Cristóbal de La Laguna ====
Holy Week in San Cristóbal de La Laguna (Tenerife), is the largest of the Canary Islands. Holy Week has steps of great historical and artistic value, such as the Cristo de La Laguna, accompanied by their guilds, some of them centuries old and which adopted the use of the hood in the nineteenth century, ride on the wheeled carts streets of the city.

==== La Orotava ====
It is one of the most important religious events in the city of northern Tenerife. A chain of fervors and evocations that collect in a mystical and self-absorbed way the celebration of the Death and Resurrection of Christ, a tradition that is part of the local religiosity and culture. Two days stand out in Holy Week in La Orotava: Holy Thursday with the Procession of the Mandate, and Good Friday, with the Procession of the Encounter.

==== Santa Cruz de Tenerife ====
The origin of Holy Week in the city and municipality of Santa Cruz de Tenerife dates back to the conquest of the island of Tenerife in the fifteenth century. Due to being a relatively large municipality, we can find many and varied celebrations both in the city center and in the outlying neighborhoods. The procession of Holy Tuesday of the Señor de las Tribulaciones and that of Holy Thursday of "La Macarena" stand out.

==== Santa Cruz de La Palma ====
Holy Week is commemorated each year in Santa Cruz de La Palma. It is one of the oldest festivities in the island of La Palma, and is the most significant public religious event that takes place in the city, except for the Lustral Festivity of the Bajada de la Virgen. In 2014 it was declared a Fiesta of Tourist Interest in the Canary Islands.

==== Las Palmas de Gran Canaria ====
Las Palmas de Gran Canaria's Holy Week it is the most important Holy Week on the island of Gran Canaria. Here the processions of Good Friday stand out, such as the Magna Procession and the Procession of the Our Lady of Solitude.

== Other celebrations ==
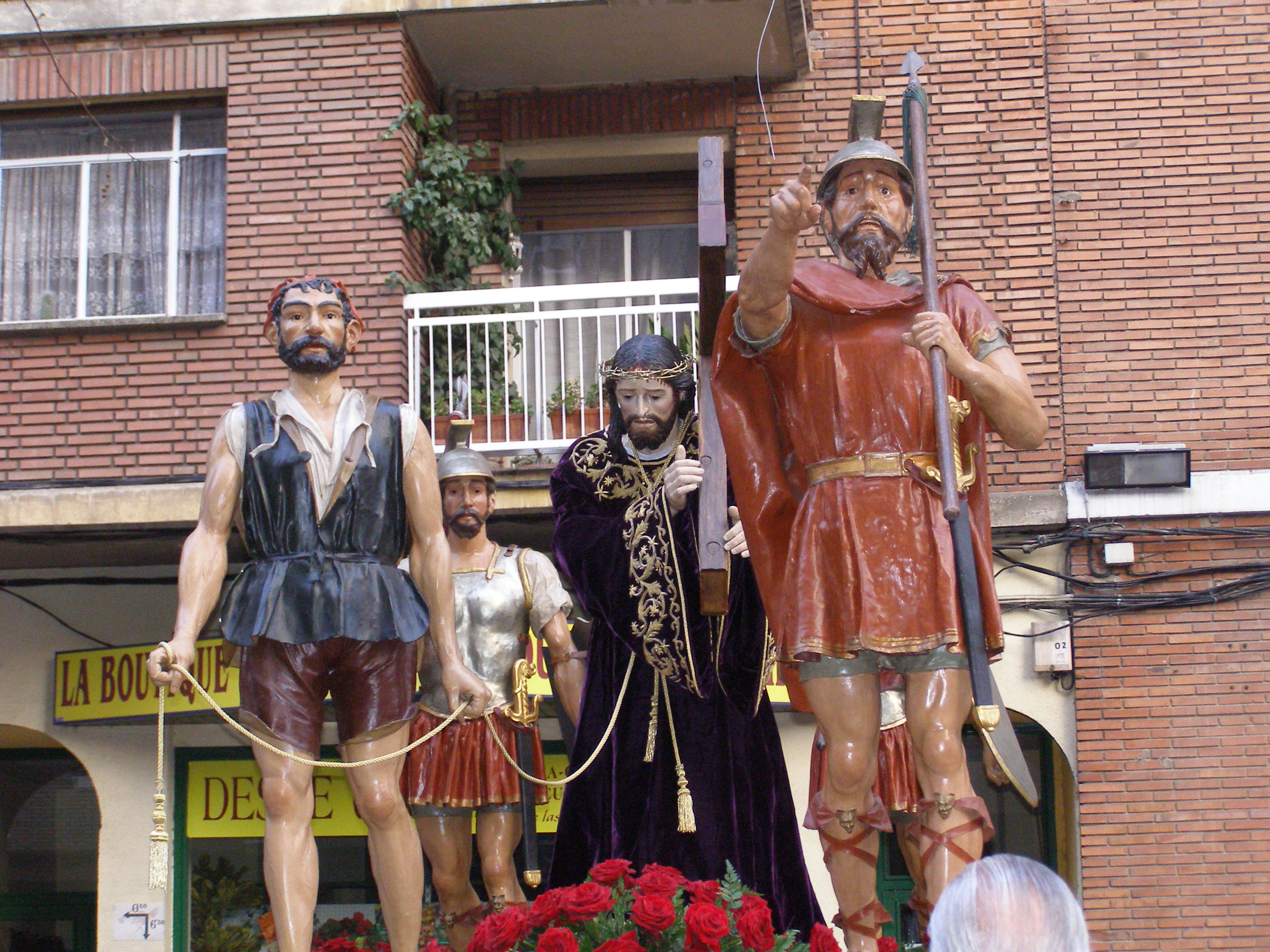
El Cinco de Copas on Tres Cruces Avenue, Zamora, on Good Friday

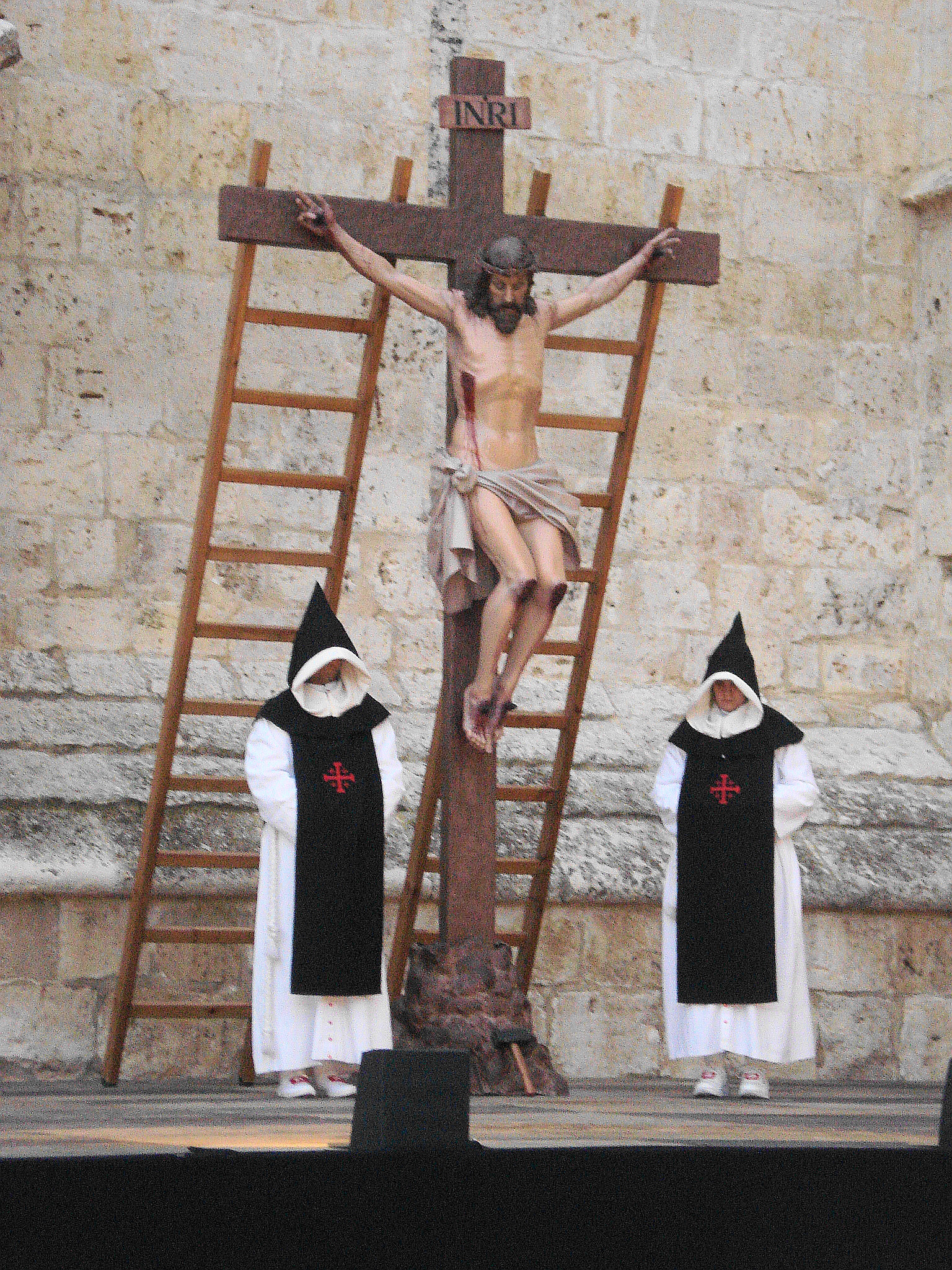
The Holy Week in Palencia.

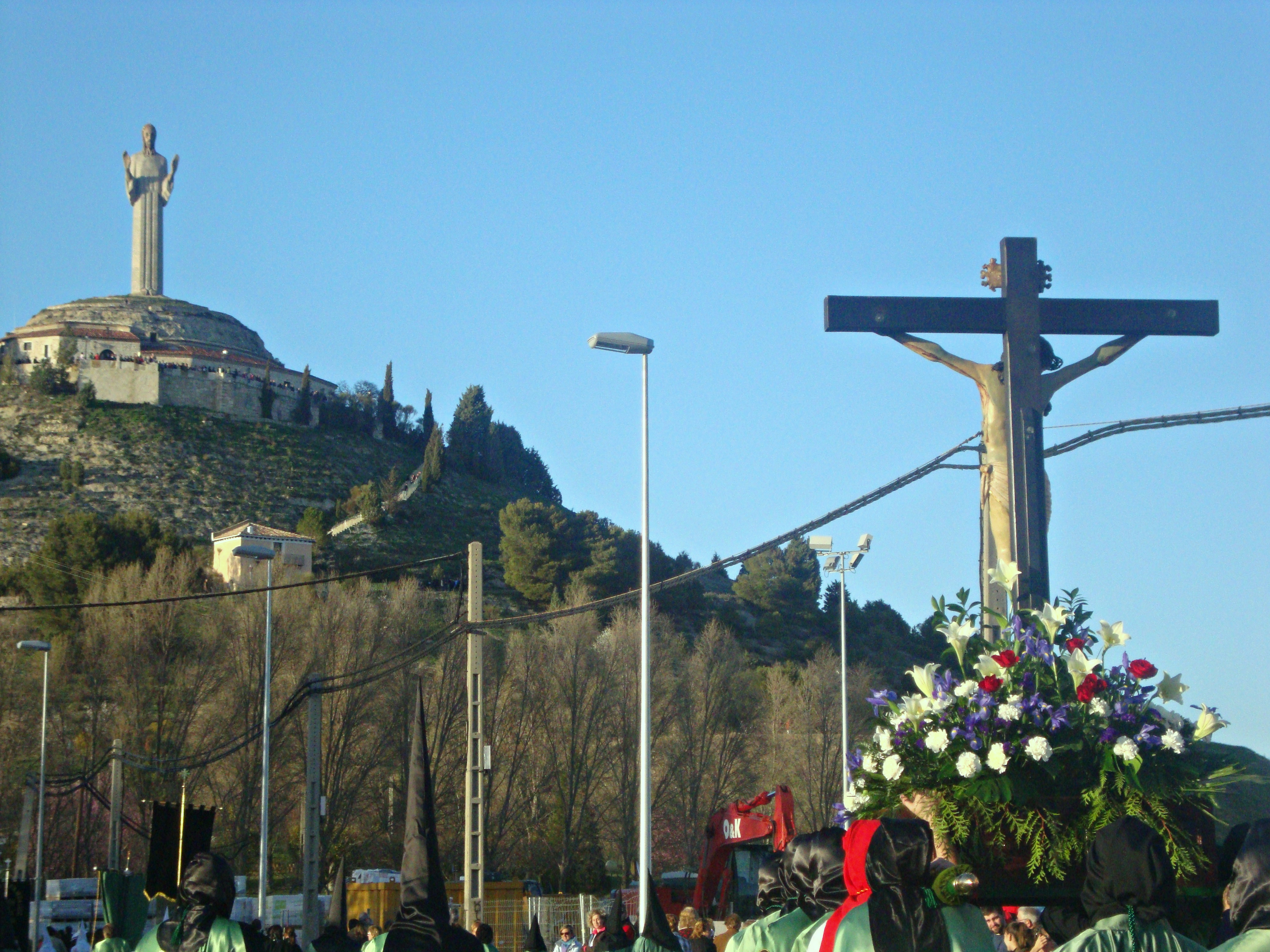
Walking to the Cristo del Otero in Palencia.

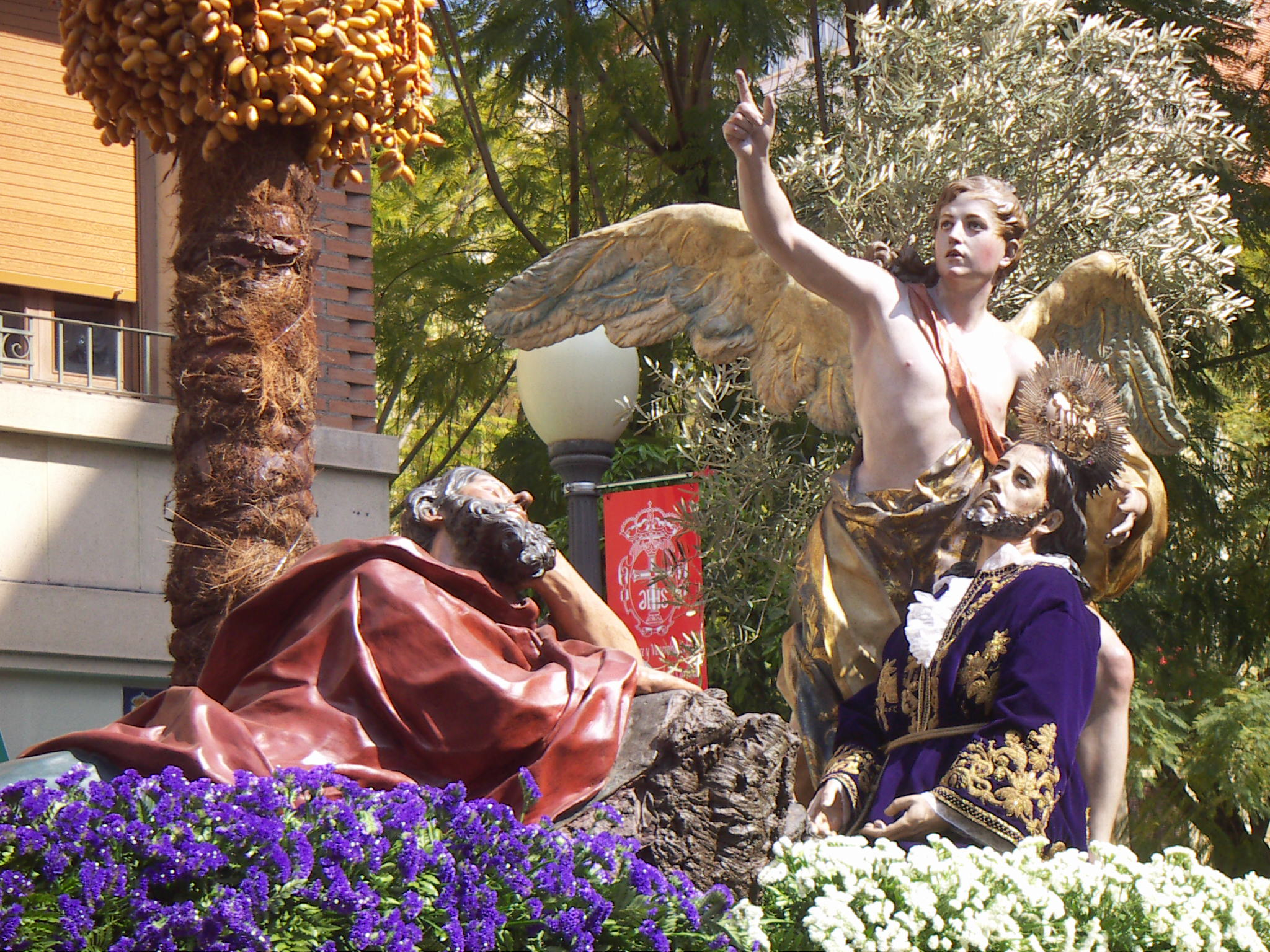
Paso by Salzillo in Murcia.

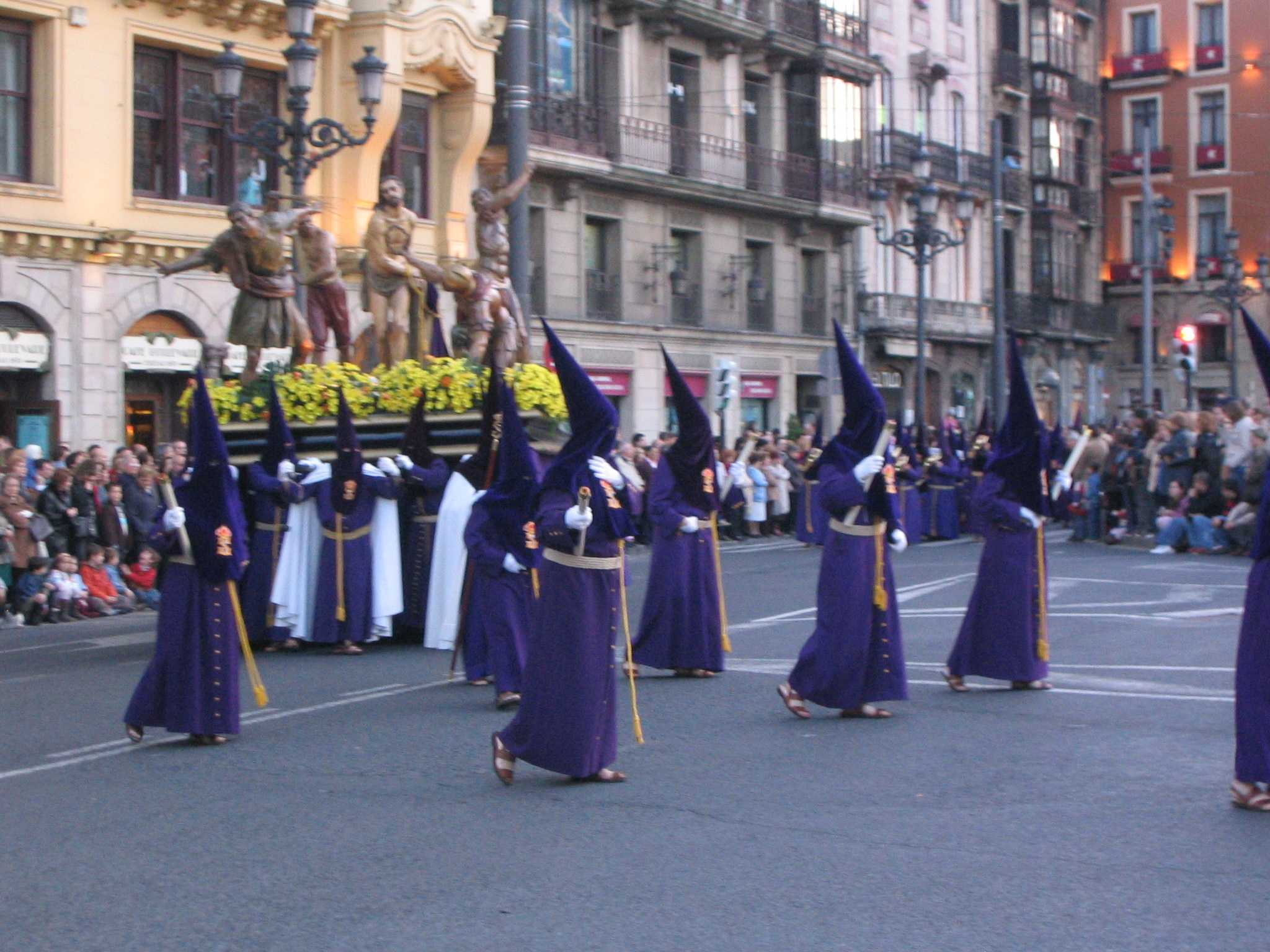
Holy Week in Bilbao.

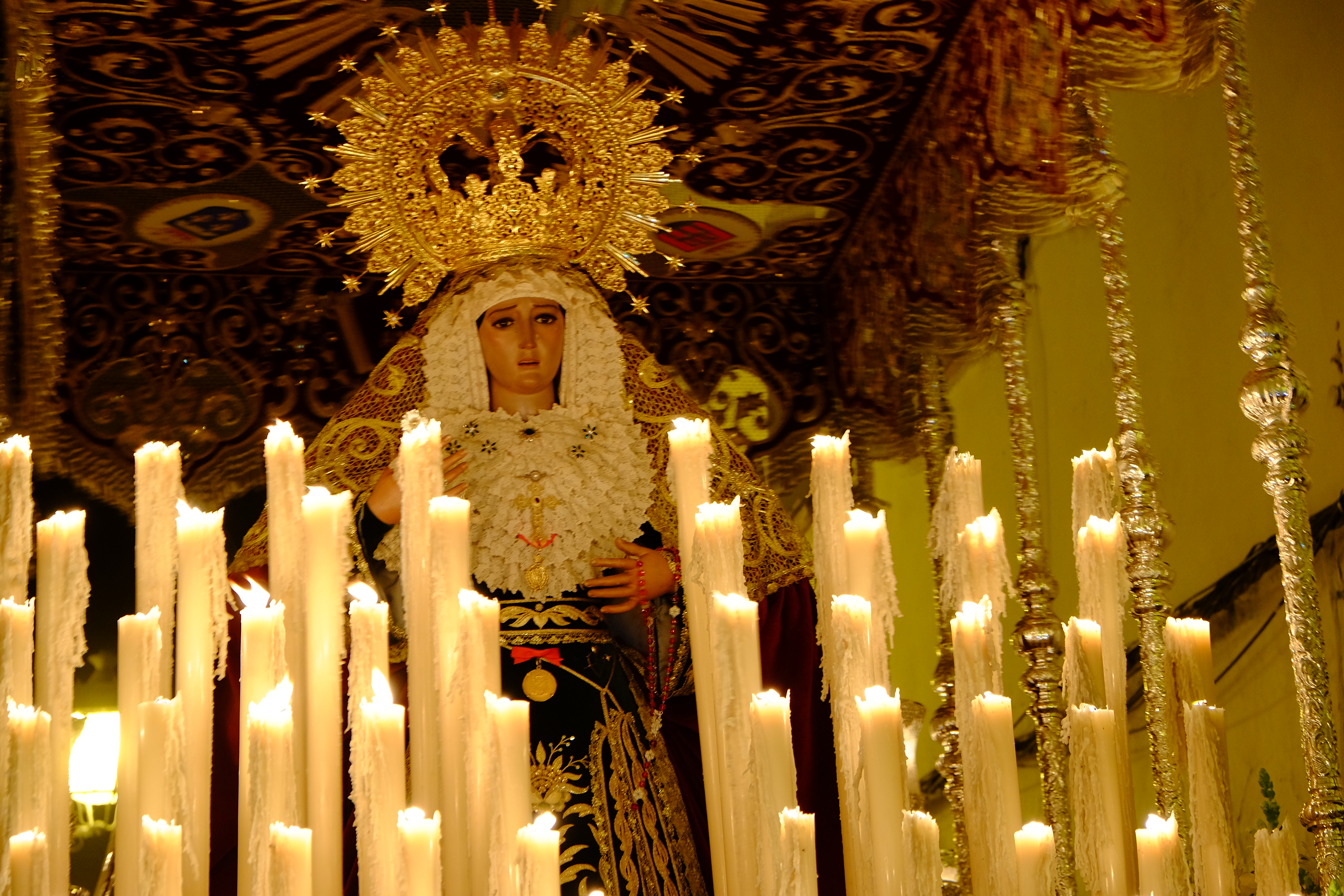
Holy Mary of Sorrows in Arcos de la Frontera.

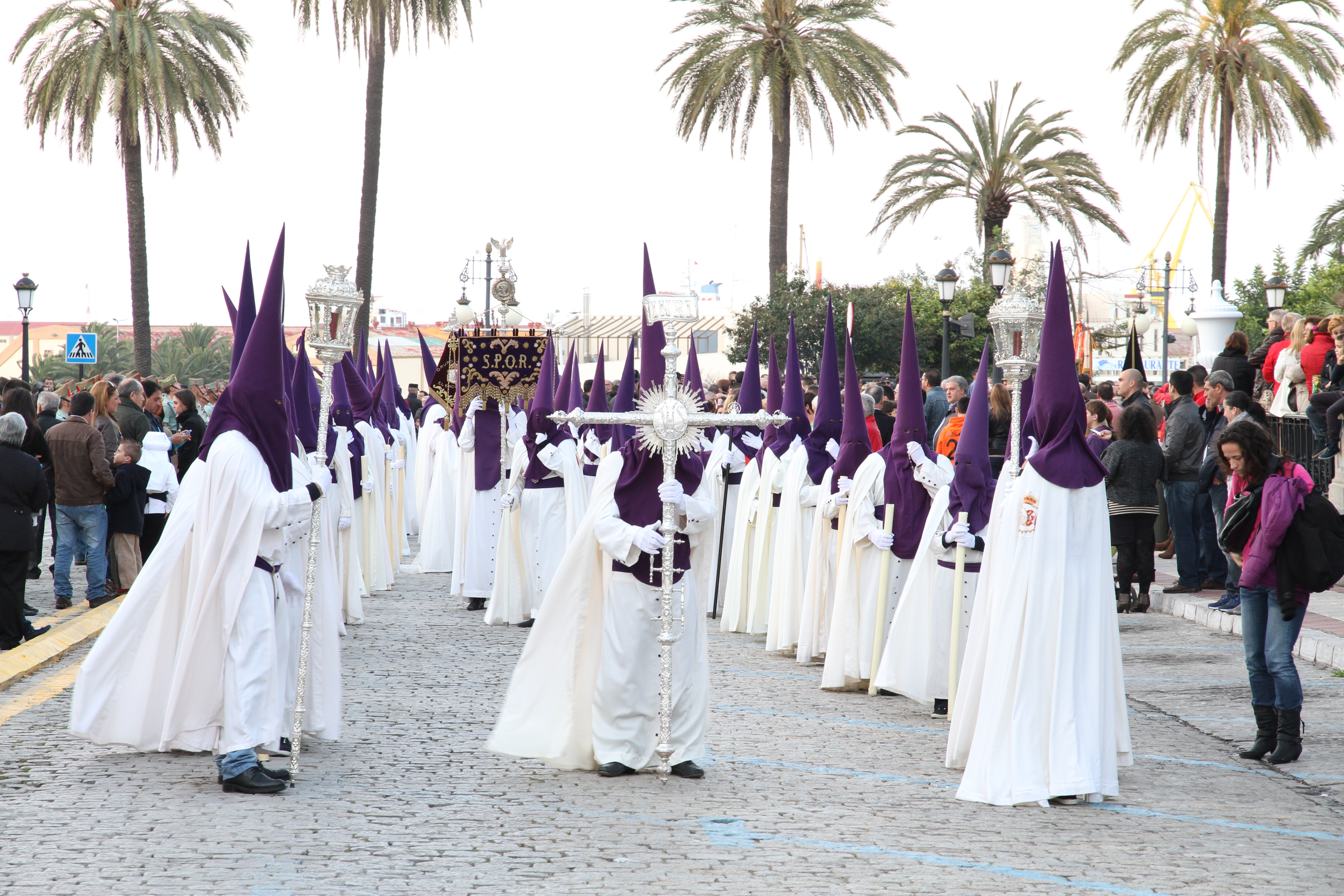
Holy Week procession in Ceuta.

=== Aragon ===
- Zaragoza

=== Asturias ===
- Oviedo
- Avilés
- Gijón
- Luanco
- Luarca/Ḷḷuarca
- Villaviciosa
- Candás
- Llanes
- Piloña

=== Basque Country ===
- Bilbao
- Balmaseda, a theatralized representation of Passion of Christ with amateur actors.

=== Castile and León ===
- Ávila
- León
- Palencia
- Salamanca, see Holy Week in Salamanca
- Valladolid, see Holy Week in Valladolid
- Zamora, see Holy Week in Zamora
- Segovia, see Holy Week in Segovia

=== Navarra ===
- Pamplona Hermandad de la Pasión de Nuestro Señor Jesucristo

=== Castilla-La Mancha ===
- Cuenca
- Hellín
- Tobarra
- Toledo Toledo Interactivo

=== Catalonia ===
- L'Hospitalet de Llobregat
- Tarragona
- Barcelona

=== Community of Madrid ===
- Alcalá de Henares
- Madrid

=== Extremadura ===
- Badajoz
- Cáceres
- Mérida
- Montijo

=== Galicia ===
- Viveiro, see Holy Week in Viveiro
- Ferrol.

=== Valencian Community ===
- Alicante
- Elche
- Llíria
- Monòver
- Orihuela

=== Canary Islands ===
- La Orotava
- Los Realejos
- San Cristóbal de La Laguna, see Holy Week in San Cristóbal de La Laguna
- Santa Cruz de Tenerife
- Las Palmas de Gran Canaria
- Santa Cruz de la Palma

=== Ceuta & Melilla ===
- Ceuta
- Melilla

== See also ==
- Catholic Church in Spain
- Holy Week
- Holy Week in Mexico
- Holy Week in the Philippines
- Holy Week procession
