= Asunción (disambiguation) =

Asunción is a Spanish word that means ascension or assumption. In most cases the name refers to the Assumption of Mary.

Asunción may refer to:

== Places ==
- Costa Rica
  - La Asunción District, in Belén Canton, Heredia province, Costa Rica
- Guatemala
  - Asunción Mita, a municipality in the Jutiapa department of Guatemala
  - La Nueva Guatemala de la Asunción, the formal name of Guatemala City, Guatemala
- Mexico
  - Asunción Cacalotepec, a town and municipality in Oaxaca, Mexico
  - Asunción Cuyotepeji, a town and municipality in Oaxaca, Mexico
  - Asunción Ixtaltepec, a town and municipality in Oaxaca, Mexico
  - Asunción Nochixtlán, a town and municipality in Oaxaca, Mexico
  - Asunción Ocotlán, a town and municipality in Oaxaca, Mexico
  - Asunción Tlacolulita, a town and municipality in Oaxaca, Mexico
- Paraguay
  - Asunción, the capital city of Paraguay
  - Gran Asunción, the metropolitan area of the city of Asunción, Paraguay
- Peru
  - Asunción District, Chachapoyas, in Chachapoyas province, Amazonas region, Peru
  - Asunción Province, a province of the Ancash Region in Peru
- Philippines
  - Asuncion, Davao del Norte, a municipality in the province of Davao del Norte, Philippines
- United States
  - Asuncion, California, an unincorporated area in the United States
  - Asuncion Island, one of the Northern Mariana Islands
- Venezuela
  - La Asunción, a city in Nueva Esparta state of Venezuela

== People ==
=== Given name ===
- Asunción Hostin (1968—), American lawyer, author and television host known as "Sunny" Hostin
- Asunción de Zea-Bermúdez (1862-1936), Spanish writer and essayist

=== Surname ===
- Al Asuncion (1929–2006), Filipino boxer
- José Asunción Flores (1904–1972), Paraguayan composer
- José Asunción Silva (1865–1896), Colombian poet
- María Asunción Aramburuzabala (1963—), the wealthiest woman in Mexico

== Other ==
- Asuncion, a German steamship built in 1895
- Asunción Paraguay Temple, a Mormon temple in Asunción
- Estadio La Asunción, a stadium in Asunción Mita, Guatemala
- First Synod of Asunción, a synod of the Roman Catholic Church of the Diocese of Paraguay in 1603
- Nuestra Señora de la Asunción de Zia, a Spanish Mission in the area that is now New Mexico, USA; established 1706
- Olimpia Asunción, a traditional Paraguayan sports club based in Asunción
- Treaty of Asunción, a 1991 economic treaty among Argentina, Brazil, Paraguay, and Uruguay
