= Cathedral of Saint Mary of the Assumption =

Cathedral of Saint Mary of the Assumption may refer to:

== Italy ==
- Cathedral of the Assumption of Mary (Lecce)
- Cathedral of the Assumption of Mary (Naples)
- Cathedral of the Assumption of Mary (Padua)
- Pisa Cathedral, formally the Primatial Cathedral of Saint Mary of the Assumption (Pisa)
- Metropolitan Cathedral of Saint Mary of the Assumption, Siena
- Metropolitan Cathedral of Saint Mary of the Assumption and Saint Geminianus, Modena

== United States ==
- Cathedral of Saint Mary of the Assumption (San Francisco, California)
- Cathedral Basilica of the Assumption (Covington, Kentucky)
- Cathedral of the Assumption (Louisville, Kentucky)
- Cathedral of St. Mary of the Assumption (Fall River, Massachusetts)
- Cathedral of Mary of the Assumption (Saginaw, Michigan)
- Cathedral of St. Mary of the Assumption (Trenton, New Jersey)

== Other countries ==
- Cathedral of the Assumption, Victoria, Malta
- Cathedral of Saint Mary of the Assumption of Lucciana, Corsica, France
- Cathedral of the Assumption of Mary (Hildesheim), Germany
- Jakarta Cathedral (Cathedral of Our Lady of the Assumption), Indonesia
- St. Mary of the Assumption Cathedral (Chilpancingo), Mexico
- Archcathedral Basilica of the Assumption of the Blessed Virgin Mary and Saint Andrew in Frombork, Poland
- Basilica Cathedral of St. Mary of the Assumption (Wloclawek, Poland)
- St Mary's Cathedral, Aberdeen (Cathedral Church of St Mary of the Assumption), Scotland
- Ceuta Cathedral (Cathedral Basilica of Our Lady of the Assumption), Spain
- Cathedral of Saint Mary of the Assumption (Chur), Switzerland
- Armenian Cathedral of the Assumption of Mary, Ukraine
- Our Lady of the Assumption Cathedral, Moncton, New Brunswick, Canada

== See also ==
- Cathedral of Saint Mary (disambiguation)
- Assumption Cathedral (disambiguation)
- Church of Nuestra Señora de la Asunción (disambiguation)
- List of churches consecrated to Santa Maria Assunta
