= Tobarra =

- municipality
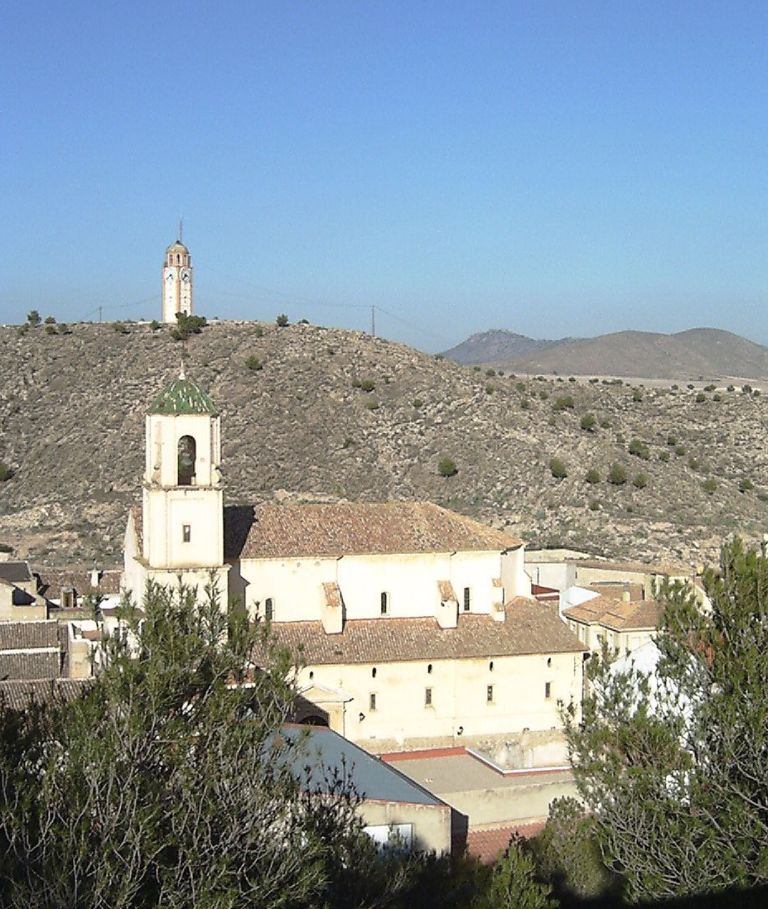
- Church of the Assumption

- Coat of arms

- Location in Spain.
- Coordinates: 38°34′59″N 1°40′59″W
- Country: Spain
- Autonomous community: Castile-La Mancha
- Province: Albacete
- Comarca: Campos de Hellín

Government
  - Mayor: Manuela Garrido Ruiz

Area
  - Total: 324.96 km^{2} (125.47 sq mi)
- Elevation: 661 m (2,169 ft)

Population (2025-01-01)
  - Total: 8,006
  - Density: 24.64/km^{2} (63.81/sq mi)
- Demonym: Tobarreños
- Time zone: UTC+1 (CET)
  - Summer (DST): UTC+2 (CEST)
- Website: Official website

Tobarra is a municipality in the province of Albacete in Spain, with a population of c. 8,000 as of 2009.

The area is famous for its "Moniquí" variety of apricots, its drum processions (tamboradas) and its Holy Week observances, declared by the government to be of National Tourist Interest. It has a "Dolorosa" sculpture by Francisco Salzillo and an articulated statue of Jesus that gives the blessing on Good Friday on a local hilltop designated Mount Calvary, before a congregation normally numbering some 30,000. After the trumpet sounds, the drums are silenced and the "Mektub" theme is sounded, while the Christ statue makes a gesture of blessing towards the four cardinal points. Other important events of the Tobarran Easter observances are the Descent from Paso Gordo from the Hermitage of the Incarnation on the afternoon of Good Thursday, and the "Cierre del Tambor" (closing drum ceremony) at midnight on Easter Sunday.

== History ==
The settlement of Tobarra is ancient: prehistoric tools and spears have been found at its boundaries, and the Santa Ana valley contains Iberian graves.

The origin of the name Tobarra is Arabic from the word "Tabarrah". Tobarra was inhabited before the Roman conquest of the Iberian Peninsula, as shown by the fact that the Via Romana which connected Complutum (Alcalá de Henares) with Carthago Nova (Cartagena) was diverted several kilometres to pass through Tobarra, and afterward continued on its way to Illunum (Minateda).

During the Visigoth era a hermitage was carved out of the rock, a short distance from the current city centre, beside a quarry that was used from Roman times until well into the 17th century.

In the Muslim era a castle and a mosque (now gone) were built, as well as an extensive irrigation network. Some of the original wells from the Andalusian era still continue to supply water to an area that was, for many years, the most important orchard of Albacete.

In 1243 the area of Alcaraz was reconquered by "Infante Alfonso" (the future Alfonso X of Castile), although it soon regained its independence.

Ferdinand IV of Castile granted the city a franchise that would be confirmed by the successive kings and nobles of Tobarra until the era of the Catholic Monarchs.

In 1324 an expedition of Nasri Moors devastated Tobarra and took part of its enslaved population to Granada, which at that time had already fallen under the influence of the powerful Señorío de Villena, who would soon become Marquess. In 1476 it was definitively joined to the Spanish crown.

On Easter Sunday 1766, Tobarra became the second place in Spain, after Madrid, to rise up against food shortages, in the Esquilache Riots. (Indeed, the Marquis of Esquilache had slept in Tobarra the night before his exile).

In 1812 the French troops under General Soult burned the town in their retreat from Murcia. Tobarra had to begin again from zero.

In the 20th century, the destruction that occurred in Spanish Civil War did away with much of the local cultural inheritance, with the exception of the head of the "Ecce Homo" image and the "Virgen de los Dolores" sculpture by Francisco Salzillo.

Around 1950, Tobarra reached its peak population of nearly 14,000. Since then, the desarrollista (development) policy of the Franco government turned growth toward the east, to the provincial capitals, leaving Tobarra to create its own economic growth.

== Main sights ==
Among its places of interest, the area includes:

- the museum of the Drum and Holy Week (Museo del Tambor y Semana Santa), located at the 17th-century Hermitage of the Virgin (Ermita de la Purísima)
- the Monument to the Drum: "La Evolución" by local sculptor Jesús D. Jiménez Ramírez (pictured right)
- the church of Our Lady of the Ascension Iglesia de Nuestra Señora de la Asunción, built between 1546 and 1616
- the sanctuary of Christ of Antiquity and the Virgin of the Incarnation, Santuario del Cristo de la Antigua y Virgen de la Encarnación, recognised as a historical and artistic national monument since 1981, with a caissoned ceiling, a dressing room with 18th-century painted murals dedicated to the Virgin, and other rococo decorations under the cupola where the Christ of Antiquity is located.

Next to the Sanctuary are the ruins of a Muslim fortress, from which one can see the tower known as Ojos del Diablo (the Devil's Eyes).

Other sights include the Town Clock, the Convent of the Franciscan Order of Saint Joseph (currently being restored), the Hispano-Visigoth stone hermitage of Alborajico, the lagoon of Alboraj, the saladares of Cordovilla and the tower of El Castellar in Sierra.
