= Asuncion, California =

Unincorporated community in California, United States

- Unincorporated community
- Location within California Location within the United States
- Coordinates: 35°30′54″N 120°40′46″W
- Country: United States
- State: California
- County: San Luis Obispo
- Elevation: 843 ft (257 m)
- Time zone: UTC-8 (Pacific (PST))
  - Summer (DST): UTC-7 (PDT)
- Area code: 805
- GNIS feature ID: 1660276

Asuncion (Spanish: Asunción, meaning "Assumption") is a former stage coach stop. All that remains of a building are a few bits of adobe rubble. A spring runs through it from the other side of the road, Traffic Way. It is thought that Juan Bautista De Anza and his party of settlers may have camped near here on their trek north. The adobe building or ruins of it were destroyed by a former owner of the farm who saw it as a potential liability. There never was a "community" here and today most people do not know the spot exists. It lies within the incorporated City of Atascadero in San Luis Obispo County, California, United States. Asuncion is located along U.S. Route 101 between Templeton and Atascadero.
