= Church of Nuestra Señora de la Asunción, Elvillar =

Church in Elvillar, Spain

Church of Nuestra Señora de la Asunción
- Iglesia de Nuestra Señora de la Asunción (Spanish); Andre Mariaren Jasokundearen eliza (Basque)
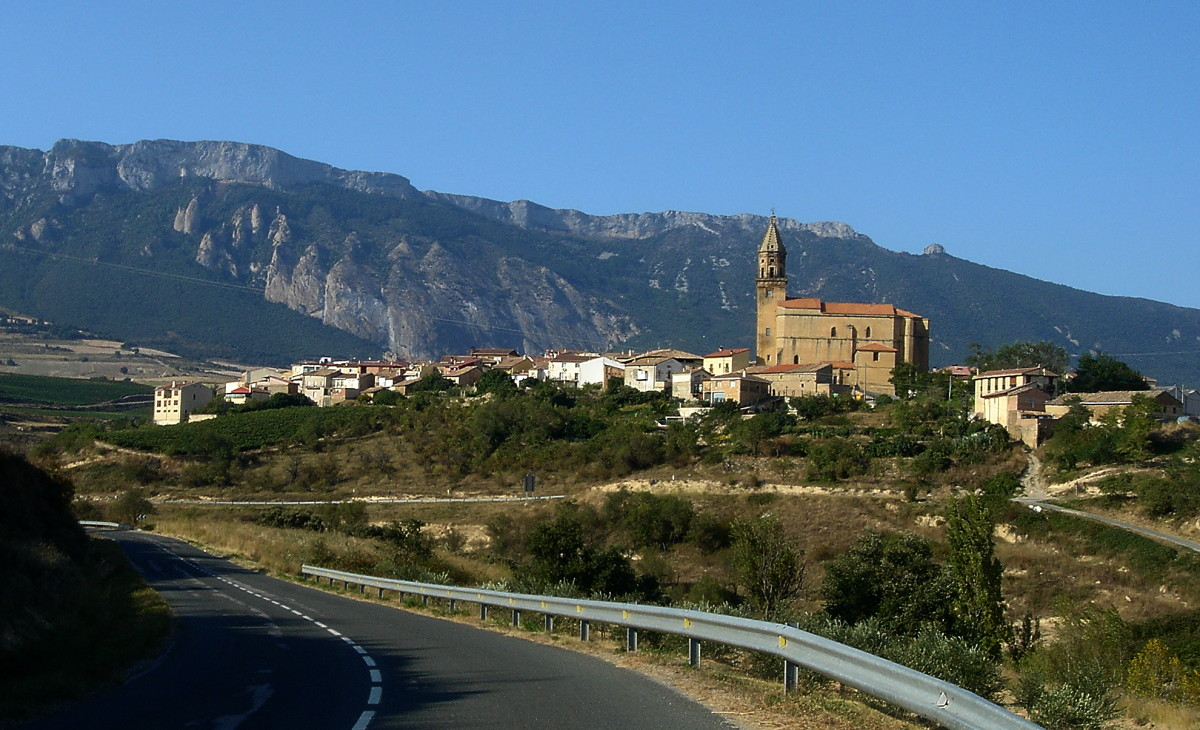
- View of Elvillar with the church visible
- 42°34′07″N 2°32′40″W
- Location: Elvillar, Álava, Basque Country
- Country: Spain
- Denomination: Catholic Church
- Tradition: Latin Church

History
- Status: Parish church

Administration
- Archdiocese: Archidiocese of Burgos
- Diocese: Diocese of Vitoria

Spanish Cultural Heritage
- Official name: Iglesia de Nuestra Señora de la Asunción
- Type: Non-movable
- Criteria: Monument
- Designated: 17 July 1984
- Reference no.: RI-51-0005106

The Church of Nuestra Señora de la Asunción (Spanish: Iglesia de Nuestra Señora de la Asunción, Basque: Andre Mariaren Jasokundearen eliza) is a church located in Elvillar, Basque Country, Spain. It was declared Bien de Interés Cultural in 1984.
