= Church of Nuestra Señora de la Asunción (Tobarra) =

- Iglesia de Nuestra Señora de la Asunción (Spanish)
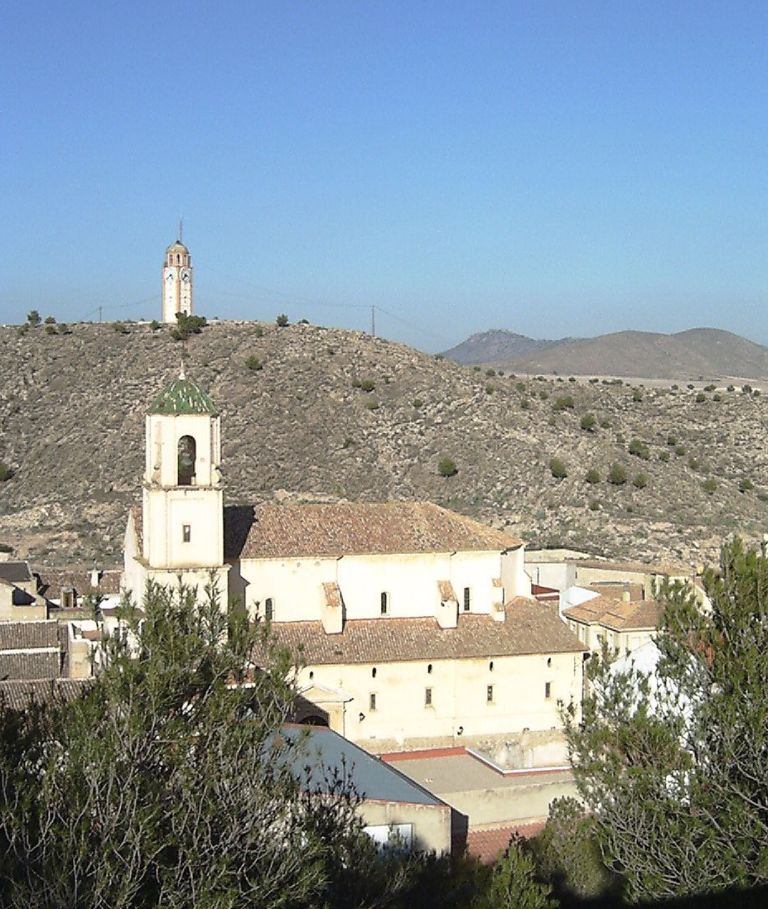

- Location within Spain
- 38.588665°N 1.69342°W
- Location: Tobarra, Spain

Spanish Cultural Heritage
- Official name: Iglesia de Nuestra Señora de la Asunción
- Type: Non-movable
- Criteria: Monument
- Designated: 2000
- Reference no.: RI-51-0010503

The Church of Nuestra Señora de la Asunción (Spanish: Iglesia de Nuestra Señora de la Asunción) is a church located in Tobarra, Spain. Church construction began in 1546 and continued until 1616. It was declared Bien de Interés Cultural in 2000.
