= Mission Nuestra Señora de la Asunción de Zía =

1610 Spanish mission to the Zia Indians

Mission Nuestra Señora de la Asunción de Zía was a Spanish Mission to the Zia Indians, established around 1610 by Franciscan missionaries accompanying Juan de Oñate. The church sustained severe damage in the Pueblo Revolt of 1680; after the reconquest of the territory by Diego de Vargas in 1692, the Franciscans returned and performed a mass baptism of the Zia. Reconstruction of the church began in 1706 under the supervision of Fray Juan Alvarez, and was completed in 1750 under Fray Manuel Bermejo.

The church building underwent several further renovations, including stuccoing in 1972 and 1998. Its retablo is painted by the anonymous artist known as the "Laguna Santero".

== See also ==
- Spanish missions in New Mexico
- Pueblo Revolt
