= Paul Försterling =

German communist and soldier (1899–1949)

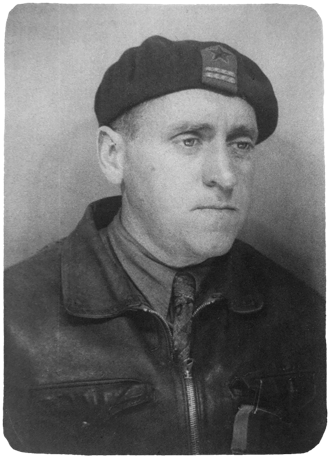
Paul Försterling

Paul Friedrich Försterling (April 1, 1899 in Berlin-Reinickendorf – February 23, 1949 in Moscow, USSR) was a German communist and soldier in the International Brigades during the Spanish Civil War.

== Life ==
Paul Försterling was born on April 1, 1899, in Reinickendorf as a son of Albert Försterling and Pauline Försterling (née Haber). He completed an apprenticeship as a tool turner. In 1918, Paul Försterling was called up for military service in the World War I, where he worked as a radio operator. In 1921, Paul Försterling traveled to Soviet Russia for the first time, where he met his future wife, Elsa Ludwigovna Yaskovskaya. He returned to Germany briefly in 1923 before moving to the Soviet Union permanently in 1924.

From 1929 to 1932, Paul Försterling studied electrical engineering at the Moscow Power Engineering Institute and successfully defended his dissertation in 1936. He worked at the Moscow transformer plant from 1933.

Paul Försterling became a Soviet citizen in 1936.

In 1937, he was initially called up to vet volunteers for the Spanish Civil War and then submitted an application himself. In Tambov Försterling was trained as a Engineer specialist and traveled to Spain in September 1937, where he became commander of an engineer unit of the XI International Brigade and took part in all the battles of the XI IB. After returning to Moscow in April 1939, he worked in the cadre department of the Communist International. During World War II he was a member of the commission for anti-fascist work among German prisoners of war.

In the 1940s, Paul Försterling suffered increasingly from hypertonia. In the fall of 1948, he applied to return to Germany with his family from the USSR. However, he suffered several strokes in early 1949 and died in Moscow on February 23rd.

Paul Försterling is entombed in the columbarium of the Donskoye Cemetery in Moscow.

=== Communist career and move to the Soviet Union ===
Paul Försterling joined the Socialist Workers' Youth in 1913. In 1916, he joined the German Metal Workers' Union. In 1918, he joined the Free Socialist Youth Movement. After returning from the World War I, he joined the USPD in January 1919, from where he switched to the KPD in March 1919. In October 1921, he was a delegate to the Workers' Youth Conference in Weimar.

In August 1921, Paul Försterling traveled to Soviet Russia, where he worked as a consultant to the Executive Committee (EC) of the Young Communist International (YCI) in Moscow until June 1922. In June 1922 he became the Executive Director of the EC of the YCI. He returned to Germany in October 1923, where he worked at the KPD headquarters until April 1924. He then traveled to Moscow again, where he was accepted into the CPSU upon the recommendation of the German section of the Communist International. Paul Försterling remained managing director of the EC of the YCI until September 1926, after which he became secretary of the agitprop department of the Executive Committee of the Communist International (ECCI) until October 1927. In October 1927 he became a consultant and editor of the German-language information bulletin of the Commission for Foreign Relations of the All-Russian Central Council of Trade Unions.

In September 1939, after taking part in the Spanish Civil War and returning to Moscow, Paul Försterling started working in the cadre department of the Communist International as senior advisor for Germany and Austria. After the German invasion of the USSR, a commission for anti-fascist work among German prisoners of war was founded, of which Paul Försterling was a member. He visited various POW camps during the war years on its behalf. From 1943, he was responsible for anti-fascist work among German prisoners of war in the KPD workforce. From August 1943 on, he also worked on cadre issues in the KPD's foreign office in Moscow and was its representative until the foreign office was dissolved.

He attended the founding party conference of the SED in 1946 as a guest delegate. In 1948, Paul Försterling asked Wilhelm Pieck to allow him to travel to Germany to assist in its post-war rebuilding. This request was approved and on December 6, 1948, the Central Secretariat of the SED decided to request him from the Central Committee of the CPSU for work in Germany. His departure was approved, but it was prevented by his illness and death.

=== Participation in the Spanish Civil War ===
After completing the courses at the Engineer School of the Red Army in Tambov in April 1937, Paul Försterling was awarded a battalion commander's certificate. On September 8, 1937, Paul Försterling left Moscow and went to Perpignan in the Pyrenees via Stockholm and Paris, supplied with a Canadian passport issued in the fictitious name of "Edgar Tallman". With other comrades, he crossed the French border into Spain, arriving at the town of Figueres.

From there, his route led through Barcelona and Valencia to Albacete, where the headquarters of the International Brigades was located. In Pozo Rubio near Albacete, he graduated from officer school and was awarded the rank of Teniente (First lieutenant). On November 1, 1937 he went to Azaila near Zaragoza to the staff of the 35th Division, where he was assigned to the XI International Brigade. Försterling became the commander of one of the engineer platoons and since then took part in all the brigade's battles.

From Azaila they went to the Aragon Front in Tardienta, where the engineers fortified the Republican positions in November and December 1937, and then to the winter quarters in Alcañiz.

On January 3, 1938, Paul Försterling and other engineers left Alcaniz for Tortajada near Teruel, where the Battle of Teruel took place. The XI Brigade took part in offensive and defensive battles there in January and February 1938.

At the end of February, the XI Brigade was moved to Cuenca for reorganization.

At the beginning of March 1938, Francisco Franco launched an offensive on the Aragon front, so the XI, XIII and XV Brigades were deployed there. Paul Försterling arrived in Azaila on March 11 with the Hans Beimler Battalion of the XI International Brigade. After the retreat of the Republican troops in March he went from Azaila via Vinaceite, La Puebla de Híjar and Caspe to Corbera and Batea.

In April, he went further in the direction of the Ebro through Corbera and Móra d'Ebre. In April and May, before the Battle of the Ebro, the sappers of the XI Brigade fortified the banks of the Ebro. Paul Försterling was responsible for organizing fortification training of the XI Brigade from April to July 1938, during which around 120 officers and 400 infantrymen were trained.

In the night of 25th of July 1938, the Republican forces crossed the Ebro. From July to September, Paul Försterling took part in offensive and defensive battles on the Ebro and in battles in Serra de Pàndols. During the battles on the Ebro, he was also an officer in the operations section of the XI International Brigade staff. From July onwards, the front came to a standstill and fierce fighting began around Serra de Pàndols. On the night of 24th September, the Interbrigades abandoned their positions and passed them over to their Spanish comrades.

After the disbandment and withdrawal of the International Brigades in September 1938, Paul Försterling remained in Catalonia until the end of 1938, writing his memoirs. On February 8, 1939, he crossed the border into France at Le Perthus and was interned in the Saint-Cyprien concentration camp. He was able to return to the USSR in April 1939.

== Personal life ==
Wife

- Elsa Ludwigovna Yaskovskaya

Children

- Elvira Pavlovna Yaskovskaya
- Eleonora Pavlovna Yaskovskaya
- Pavel Pavlovich Yaskovskiy

== Bibliography ==
- Försterling, Paul. ""Mit Picke, Spaten und Dynamit." Erinnerungen eines Teilnehmers des Spanischen Bürgerkrieges 1937-1939".
- Abel, Werner; Hilbert, Enrico (2015). Sie werden nicht durchkommen (Band 1) [They shall not pass (Volume 1)] (in German) (1st ed.). Lich / Hessen: Verlag Edition AV. p. 150. ISBN 978-3-86841-112-6.
- Berg, Angela (2005). Die Internationalen Brigaden im Spanischen Bürgerkrieg 1936-1939 [The International Brigades in the Spanish Civil War 1936-1939] (in German). Essen: Klartext Verlag. ISBN 3-89861-418-2.
- Erler, Peter (2000). Müller-Enbergs, Helmut; Wielgohs, Jan; Hoffmann, Dieter (eds.). Wer war wer in der DDR? [Who was who in the GDR?] (in German). Berlin: Christoph Links Verlag. pp. 219–220. ISBN 3-89331-397-4.
- Ludwick, Pyotr (Percy) (1986). Aleksandrovskaya, Sofya; Breidbard, Sarra; Goffe, Irina; Gudovich, Solomon; Kruchenykh, Arkadi (eds.). Мы — Интернационалисты [We, the Internationalists] (in Russian) (2nd ed.). Moscow: Izdatelstvo politicheskoy literatury. pp. 103–111.
- Szinda, Gustav (1956). Die XI. Brigade [The 11th Brigade] (in German). Berlin: Verlag des Ministeriums für nationale Verteidigung.
- Cherdantseva, Yelena (2024). Последняя загадка М. Булгакова. Донское кладбище Москвы, новая территория [The last riddle of M. Bulgakov. Moscow's Donskoye Cemetary, new area] (in Russian). Novosibirsk: Sibprint. pp. 163–164. ISBN 978-5-98297-020-6.
