= Holy Week in Zaragoza =

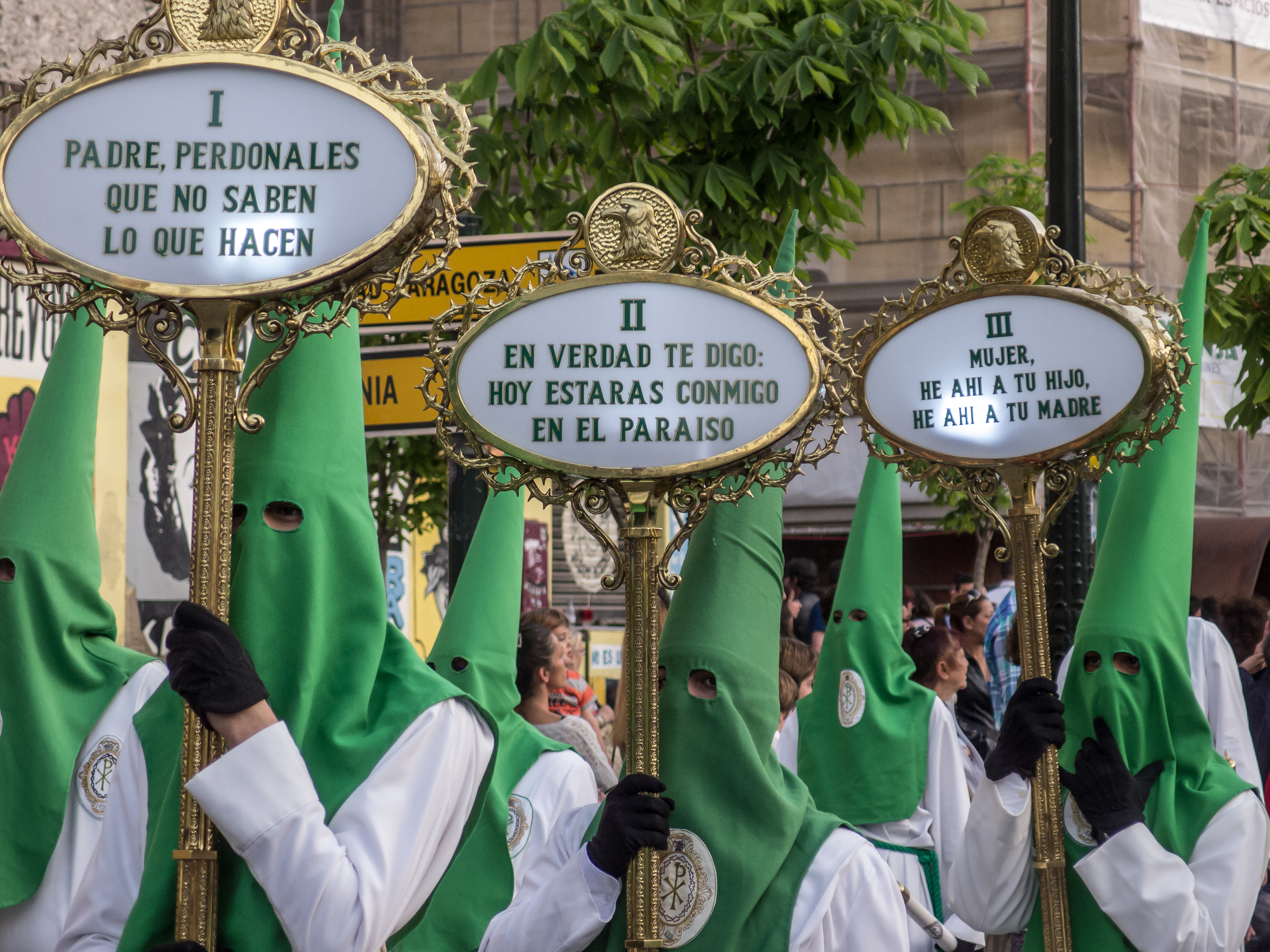
- Cofradia de las siete palabras
- Official name: Semana Santa de Zaragoza
- Observed by: Zaragoza, Spain
- Type: Religious, Historical, Cultural
- Significance: Commemoration of the passion, death and resurrection of Jesus
- Celebrations: Processions
- Begins: Palm Sunday
- Ends: Easter Sunday
- 2024 date: March 24 – March 31
- 2025 date: April 13 – April 20
- 2026 date: March 29 – April 5
- 2027 date: March 21 – March 28
- Frequency: Annual

Holy Week in Zaragoza, although not as elaborate an affair as its Andalusian or Bajo Aragón counterparts, has several processions passing through the city centre every day with dramatic sculptures, black-dressed praying women and hundreds of hooded people playing drums. It has been a Festival of International Tourist Interest since 2014.
