= Ruta del tambor y el bombo =

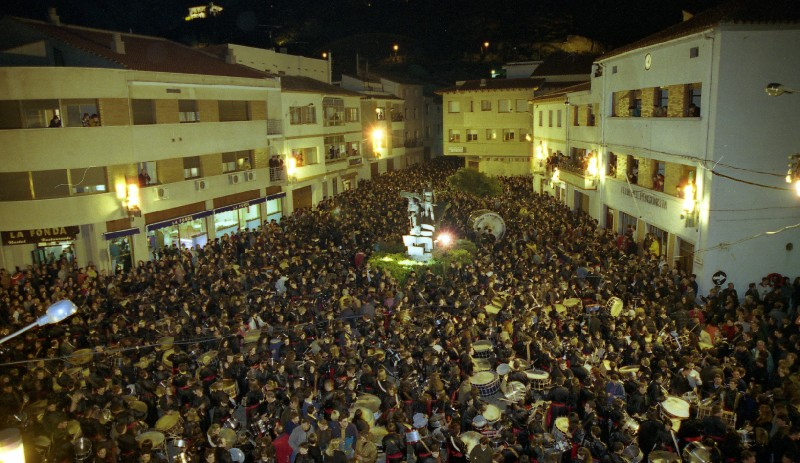
- The drummers gather at Andorra's town hall square
- Dates: Holy Week
- Frequency: Annual
- Locations: Albalate del Arzobispo, Alcañiz, Alcorisa, Andorra, Calanda, Híjar, La Puebla de Híjar, Samper de Calanda and Urrea de Gaén, Spain

Fiesta of International Tourist Interest
- Designated: 2014

The Ruta del Tambor y el Bombo (transl. "Drum and Bass Drum Route") is an Easter celebration that takes place in nine towns in the province of Teruel, southeastern Aragon, Spain. These towns include Albalate del Arzobispo, Alcañiz, Alcorisa, Andorra, Calanda, Híjar, la Puebla de Híjar, Samper de Calanda, and Urrea de Gaén. During Holy Week, many residents wear traditional tunics and play drums and bass drums in processions and at specific events. The combined sound of the drums creates a distinctive noise.

A central feature of the celebration is the Rompida de la Hora ("Breaking of the Hour"), when all the drummers start playing at the same time. This event, which symbolizes the tremor following the death of Christ, takes place on Maundy Thursday at midnight in most towns, and at noon on Good Friday in Calanda. Drumming continues through the week and stops at a set time on Easter Saturday. Each town has its own unique drum rolls and tunic colors.

The origins of the Ruta del Tambor y el Bombo are believed to be from medieval times, possibly introduced by knights who brought percussion instruments to the area. The event became more widely known through filmmaker Luis Buñuel, a native of Calanda, who included it in some of his films.

Until the 1980s, drum playing in some towns was restricted to men, but since then, women have gradually become involved.

The celebration in Híjar was declared a Festival of National Tourist Interest in 1980, with the other towns recognized in 2005. In 2014, the Spanish Ministry of Industry and Tourism declared the Ruta del Tambor y el Bombo as a Fiesta of International Tourist Interest of Spain. In 2018, UNESCO included the event in its list of Intangible Cultural Heritage of Humanity.
