= Albacete Fair =

Tourism in Spain

Fair of Albacete
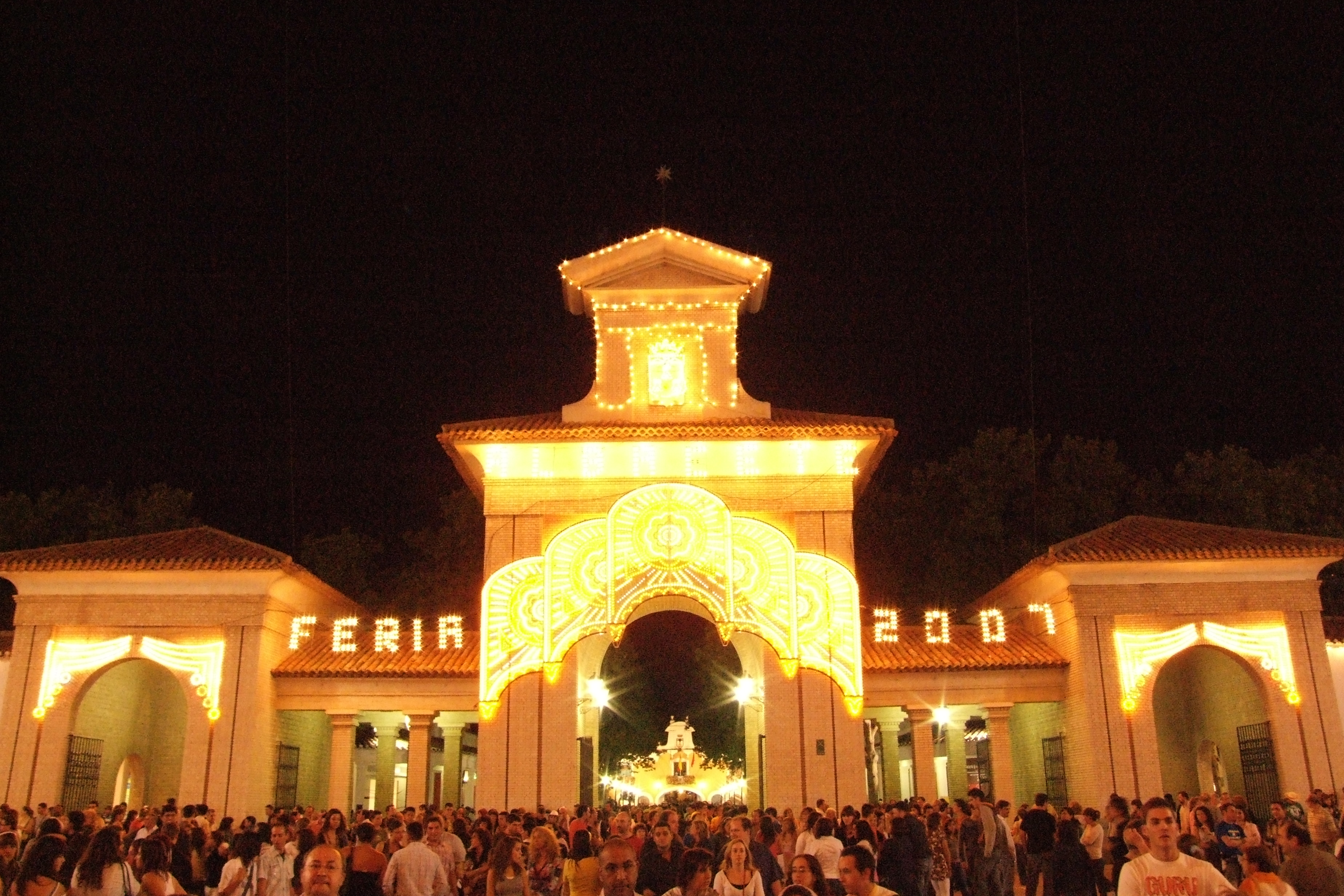
- Iron Gate of the Fairground Building
- Date: 7–17 September
- Frequency: Annual
- Venue: Fair of Albacete
- Locations: Albacete, Spain
- Inaugurated: 1200

Fiesta of International Tourist Interest
- Designated: 2008

The Fair of Albacete is celebrated from 7–17 September in the city of Albacete, Spain, to honor the Virgen de Los Llanos, which translates to Virgin of the Plains. It was declared a Fiesta of International Tourist Interest and takes place in the permanent fairground commonly known as 'the Pan' or 'the Circles' situated near the centre of the city. It has a bullfighting activity, and the city is reputed to quadruple its population during the festivities.

The first mentions of the annual fair date back to the first decade of the 1200s. Its importance grew throughout the subsequent centuries, which led the Catholic Monarchs to recognize it. The most famous instance of the fair was 6 March 1710 during the Spanish war of succession. The monarch of the Bourbon, Felipe V, gave the city the privilege of realizing an annual franc fair for a length of four days. Since then, the fair gradually grew to the ten-day period known today.

The fairground building was built in 1783. It has a 'pan' shape, and it is an example of Manchegan architecture built for a commercial goal. The body of the Pan has concentric rings that holds the commercial stands.

== History ==
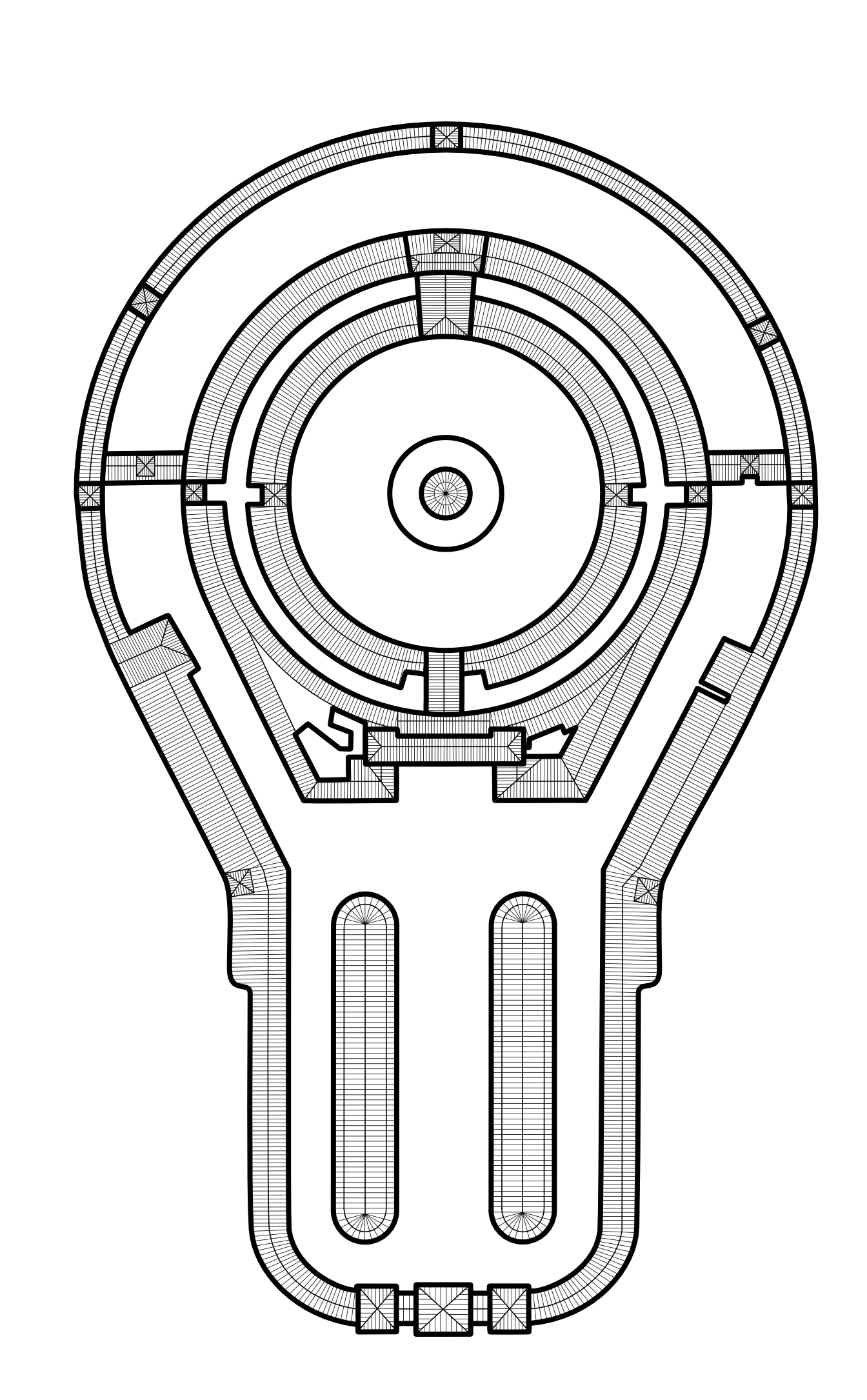
Plano actual del Recinto Ferial

Testimonies from the 15th century were found mentioning a regular market held on Feria Street. The market lasted for 10 days, which started on 30 November and later on shifted to start on 28 August. This street still preserves its name, linking San Juan's Cathedral with Santa Catalina's plains, where the Fairground Building now stands.

In the 17th century, the market was moved outside the centre of the city, as there was significant commerce parallel to the parade every 8 September in the relevant places of Los Llanos. In 1672, near the chapel of the Virgin, a Franciscan convent was founded. In 1683, it was requested to king Carlos III that he declared the franc fair had to last for 3 days (7-9 September), and its location be established in the proximity of the convent near Los Llanos because it increases the chances of getting alms.

Even though this request was not fulfilled, on 6 March 1710, Philip V gave the city the privilege of a franc fair for 4 days (from 7 to 11 September). The city hall disposed that it should take place in the urban center, the Main Street, and the Main Square, while the traders could still go to the place of Los Llanos. Between 1710 and 1712, which is defined as the divided fair, it was celebrated 2 days in the place commanded by the city hall, and the rest near the Franciscan convent.

The attempts to take the fair back to Albacete drove the City Hall to buy a market building to build the Fairground Building, but this project never took place. In 1783, there was an agreement to build that building in the Plain of Santa Catalina, following the sketch of the Spanish architect Josef Ximenez. They were inaugurated on 7 September 1783 and completely finished the next year. From that time, the fair was held in the urban center of Albacete, with a few exceptions. Most notably, the fair did not take place during the years 1937 and 1938 due to the Spanish Civil War.

=== Alterations of the Fairground Building ===
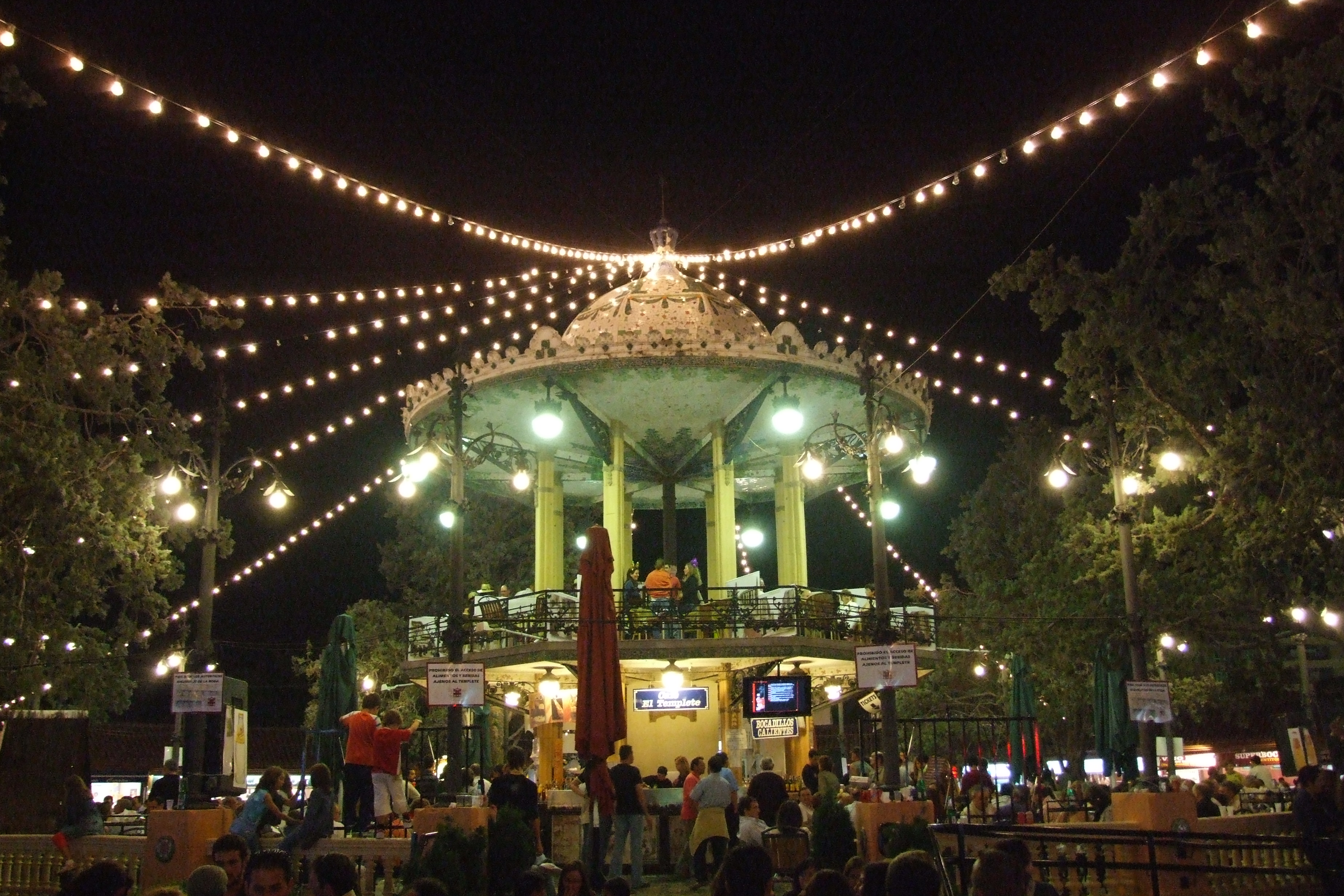
Bandstand in modernist style, inside the fair circle. (1912)

At the time of its inauguration in 1783, the building, built over the course of 33 days, consisted only of the exterior walls and the interior circle. It was finished in the following year.

Among the alterations and ampliations which took place at the Fairground Building from its beginnings, there were several notable buildings.

In 1876, the columns of the central circles were replaced by iron ones.

Until 1877, there was a fountain for cattle in the center of the building. The fountain was removed and replaced by a kiosk.

In 1912, the modernist kiosk was built, which was restored and still exists today.

In 1944, major work was done to make the building bigger, adding a third circle to the Pan, the exposition room, and two more saloons at the entrance.

In 1974, the neoclassic façade was changed into white bricks, following the design of the architect Manuel Carrilero.

Between 2008 and 2010, for the 300th anniversary of the fair, major improvements were made to the fairgrounds and surrounding areas, including subterranean parking under the "Paseo." Another upgrade was a new iron gate, similar to the old one on the entrance of Los Jardinillos, in front of the Bullfighting ring.

There was no fair in 2020.

== Traditions ==
=== Opening Parade ===
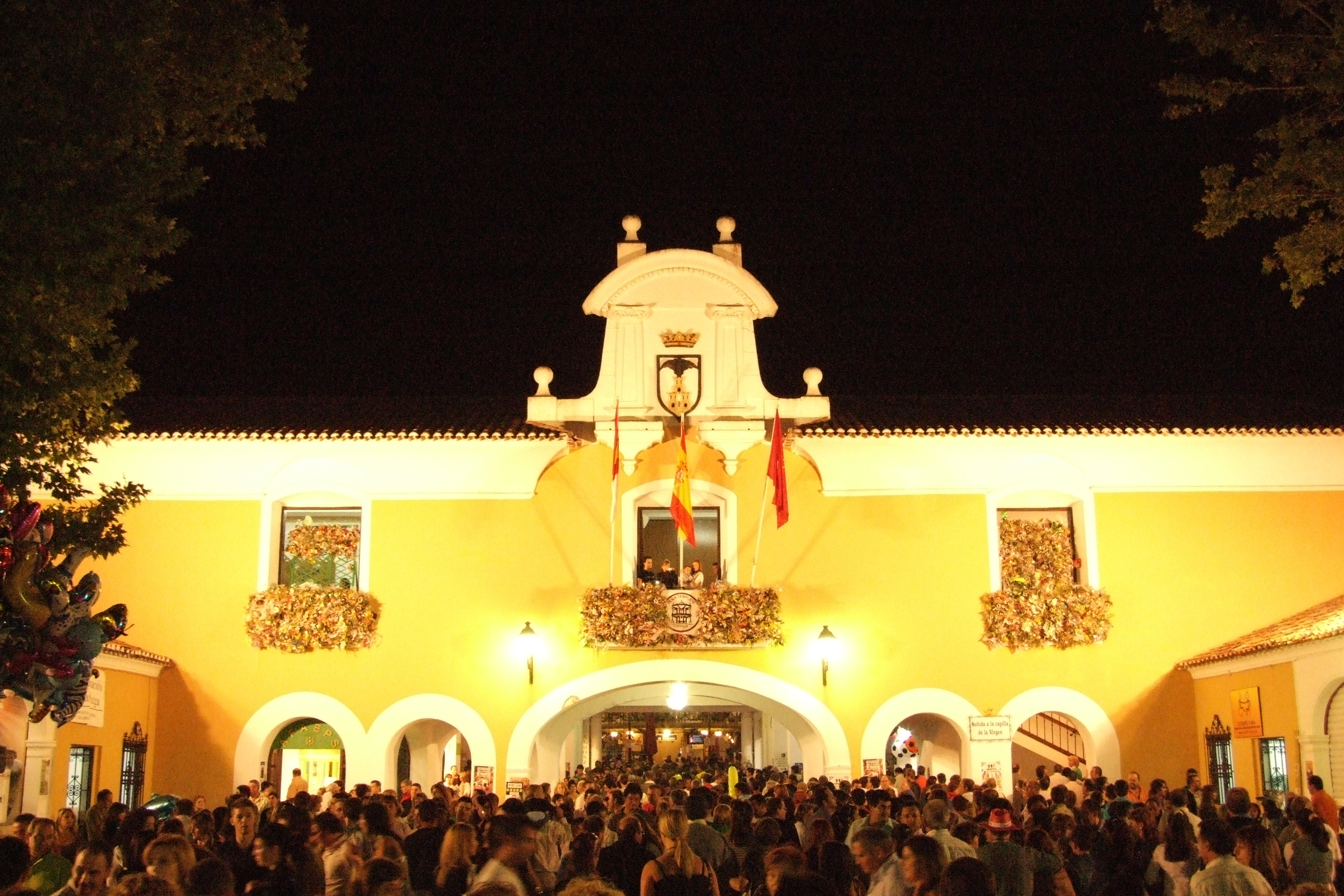
Capilla de la Virgen de Los Llanos at the fairgrounds.

The opening parade is the first event of the fair (La Feria). Its mission is to take the image of the Virgin of Los Llanos to the Recinto Ferial. It ends with the opening of the main gate (Puerta de Hierros) of the building. This opening has been carried out at night since 1909. Before 1909, it was performed in the morning.

The parade typically has about 100 floats, brass bands, and manchegas with various costumes. The parade starts on Avenida de España and finishes at the main gate of the Recinto Ferial when the mayor of the city opens the gate and fireworks are launched. In 2008, the fireworks were replaced by a light and sound spectacle. This commemorates the official opening of the fair. After that, the image of the Virgen de Los Llanos is taken to its chapel, where it resides for the next 10 days.

=== Floral offering ===
A floral offering has been organized by the Peña Templete since 1989. Almost 20,000 people participate in it on the first Sunday of the fair. The offering starts in the cathedral and ends at the gate of the Chapel inside the Recinto Ferial. On its balcony, the image of the Virgen is represented. The Fair has different parts:

==== The walk ====
At the beginning of the walk, several tombolas and games are installed. The Cáritas Tombola, traditionally managed by Cáritas, collects proceeds that are donated to charitable causes. Its origin lies in 1953 when it was created to build houses for working-class people.

=== Los Ejidos ===
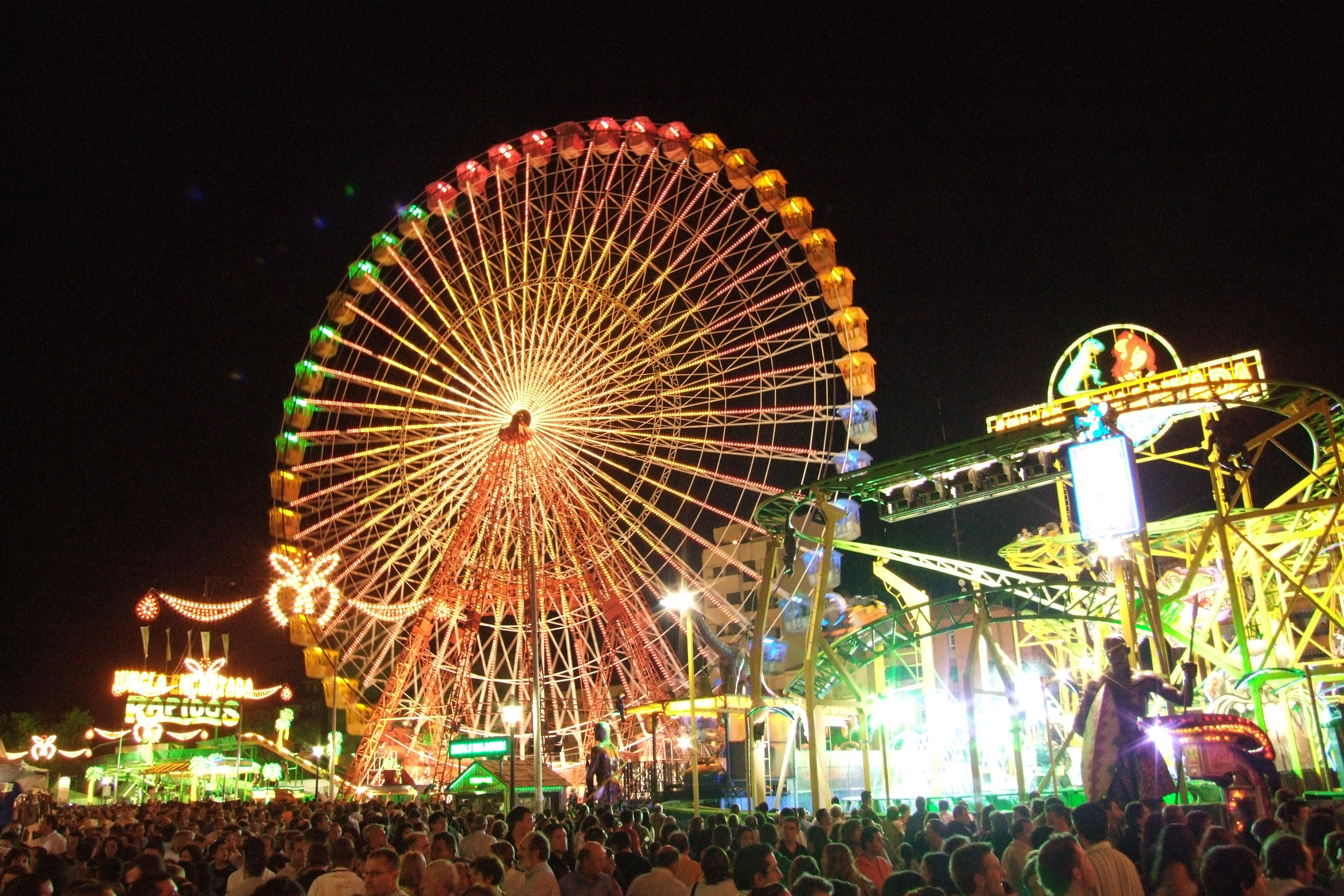
Attractions located in Los Ejidos.

Los Ejidos, the place surrounding the fairgrounds, is where cattle used to be sold. It lost that usage when machinery began consumption in the fields instead of animal labor. Now, the area hosts a music pavilion for free concerts, craftwork and toy stands, stalls for businesses, and other larger fair attractions.

==== The Inner Circle ====
The stands and pavilion located in Los Ejidos are still open until the early morning. At the end of the main walk of the Pan, there are several stands where different associations and commerce groups exhibit products from different parts of Castilla la Mancha. One of these popular products is the Miguelitos de la Roda, a puff pastry filled with custard and powdered sugar on top.

There is also a knife exhibition opened to the public with art pieces from the Albacete knife industry, displayed year-round at the Museum of Knives.

Until 2007, there was a toro de fuego of Barrax. The "toro" was a cart with firecrackers held by a person who walked the area. The spectacle was removed due to its potential danger.
