= Bajo Martín =

Coordinates: 41°09′N 0°28′E

- Comarca
- Interactive map of Bajo Martín
- Country: Spain
- Autonomous community: Aragon
- Province: Teruel
- Capital: Híjar
- Municipalities: List: See text

Area
  - Total: 997.3 km^{2} (385.1 sq mi)

Population
  - Total: 12,604
  - Density: 12.64/km^{2} (32.73/sq mi)
- Time zone: UTC+1 (CET)
  - Summer (DST): UTC+2 (CEST)
- Largest municipality: Caspe

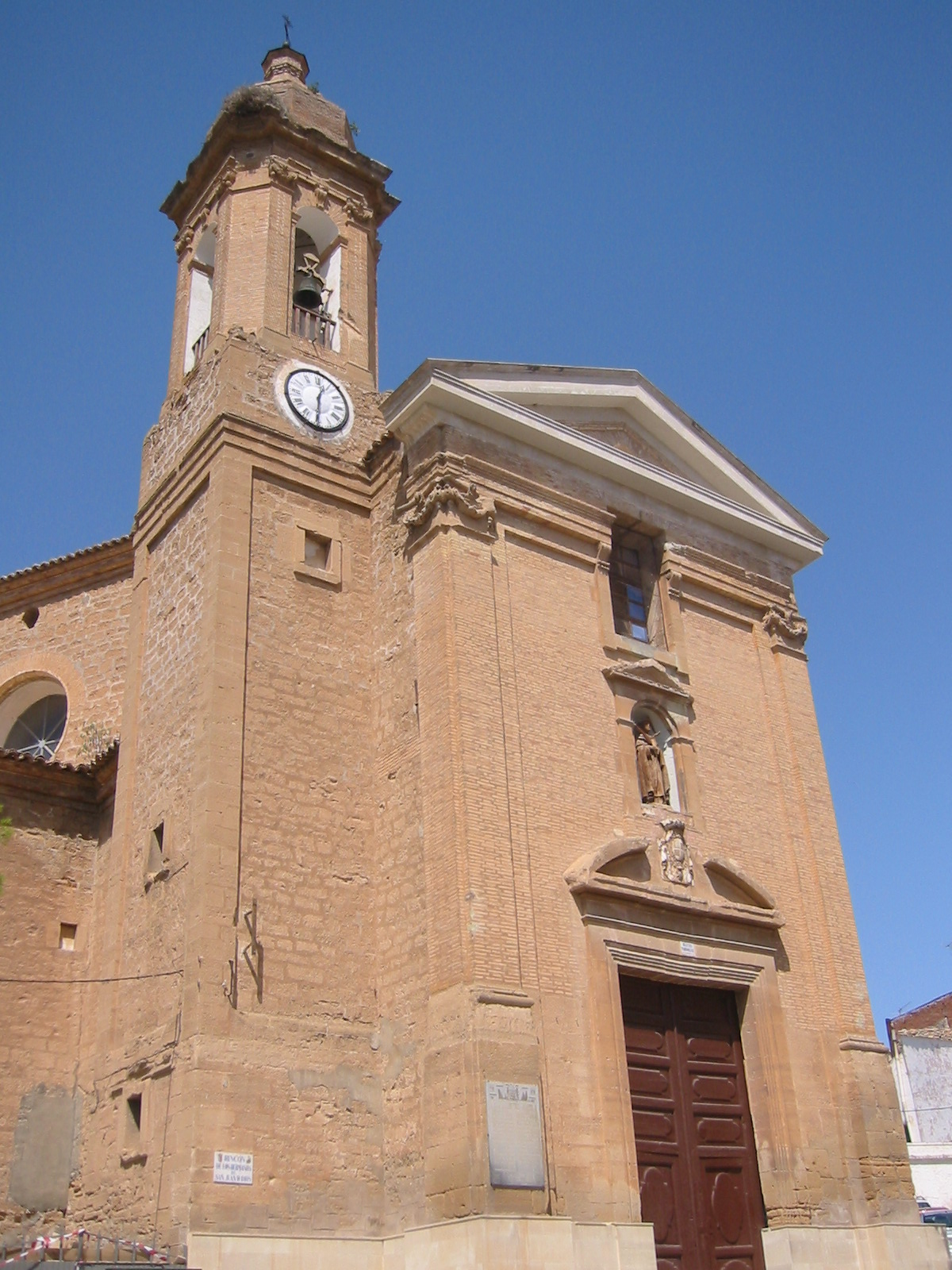
San Pedro Mártir Church, Urrea de Gaén.

Bajo Martín is a comarca in Aragon. It is part of the historical region of Lower Aragon. It is located in Teruel Province, in the transitional area between the Iberian System and the Ebro Valley.

It borders the Aragonese comarcas of Ribera Baja del Ebro, Campo de Belchite, Cuencas Mineras, Andorra-Sierra de Arcos, Bajo Aragón and Bajo Aragón-Caspe.

The Bajo Martín is named after the Martín River, a right-side tributary of the Ebro that flows across the comarca.

== Neglect ==
This comarca was formerly connected with Tortosa by means of a railway line from La Puebla de Híjar. Known as "Ferrocarril del Val de Zafán", the line stretched to Alcañiz and Tortosa. Eventually it was planned that it would reach the sea at Sant Carles de la Ràpita.

Construction work on the railway line began in 1891, but the last stretch between Tortosa and Sant Carles de la Ràpita was never completed before the line was abandoned and the rails dismantled in the last quarter of the 20th century.

== Municipalities ==
- Albalate del Arzobispo
- Azaila
- Castelnou
- Híjar
- Jatiel
- La Puebla de Híjar
- Samper de Calanda
- Urrea de Gaén
- Vinaceite
