= Holy Week in Viveiro =

Tradition in Viveiro, Spain

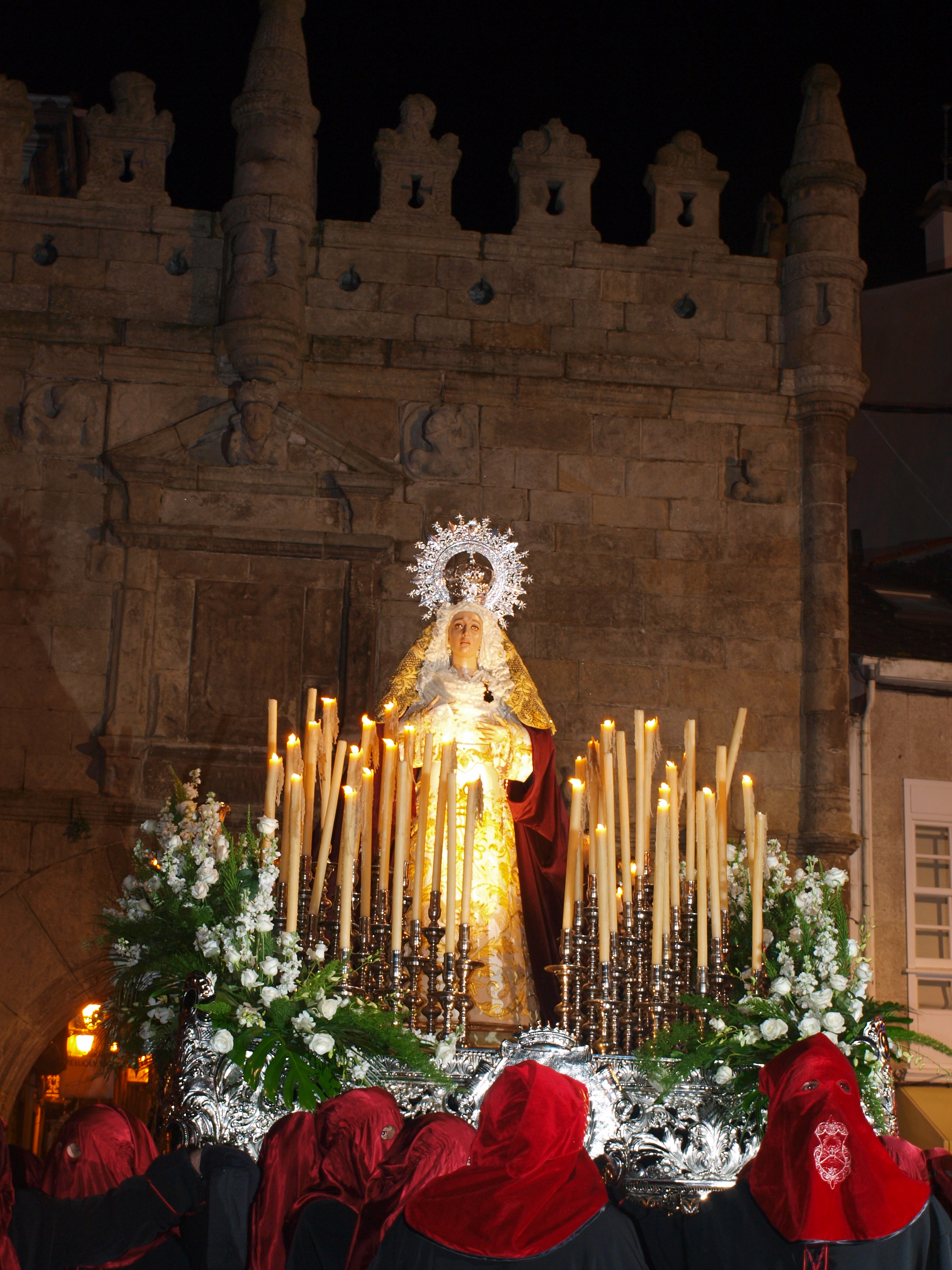
- The "Virgen de la Clemencia"
- Official name: Semana Santa de Viveiro
- Observed by: Viveiro, Spain
- Type: Religious, Historical, Cultural
- Significance: Commemoration of the passion, death and resurrection of Jesus
- Celebrations: Processions
- Begins: Palm Sunday
- Ends: Easter Sunday
- 2024 date: March 24 - March 31
- 2025 date: April 13 - April 20
- 2026 date: March 29 - April 5
- 2027 date: March 21 - March 28
- Frequency: Annual

Holy Week in Viveiro (Semana Santa de Viveiro) is one of the most important traditional events of Viveiro, Spain. It is celebrated in the week leading up to Easter (Holy Week among Christians), and is one of the best known religious events within Galicia. As a reflection of its importance, is also considered as a Fiesta of International Tourist Interest of Spain since 2013.

This week features the procession of pasos, floats of lifelike wooden sculptures of individual scenes of the events of the Passion, or images of the Virgin Mary showing restrained grief for the torture and killing of her son. Some of the sculptures are of great antiquity and are considered artistic masterpieces, as well as being culturally and spiritually important to the local Catholic population.

During Holy Week, the city is crowded with residents and visitors, drawn by the spectacle and atmosphere. The impact is particularly strong for the Catholic community. The processions are organised by hermandades and cofradías, religious brotherhoods. During the processions, members precede the pasos, dressed in penitential robes. They may also be accompanied by brass bands.

The processions work along a designated route from their home churches and chapels, usually via a central viewing area and back. As of 2011, a total of 15 processions are scheduled for the week, from the previous Friday to Palm Sunday through to Easter Sunday afternoon.

== See also ==
- Viveiro
- Holy Week in Spain
- Fiestas of International Tourist Interest of Spain
