= Elche Palm Sunday Procession =

Spanish festival

Elche Palm Sunday Procession Diumenge de Rams d'Elx
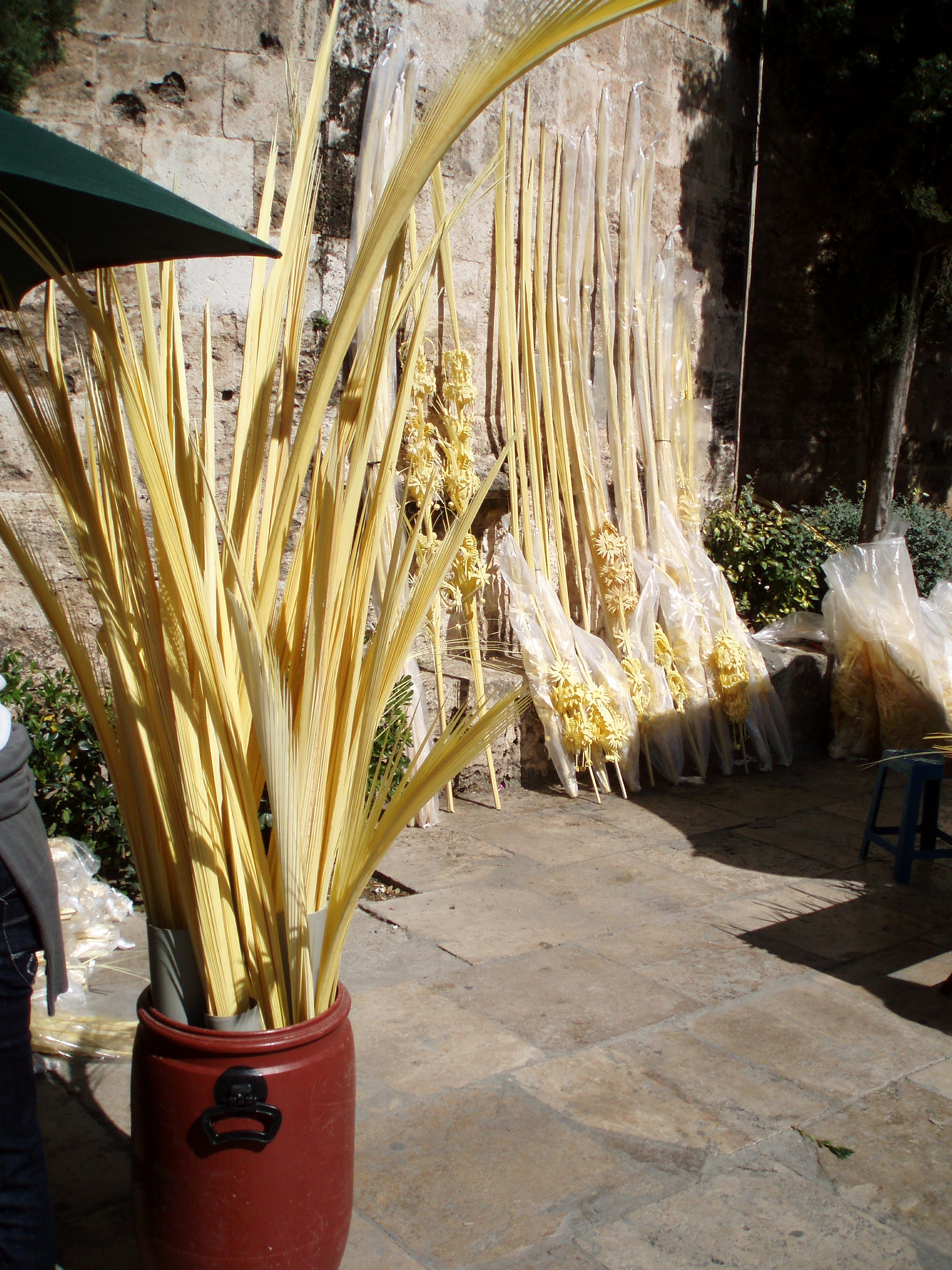
- Palms used in the procession
- Status: Active
- Genre: Religious procession
- Date: Palm Sunday
- Frequency: Annual
- Locations: Elche, Spain

Fiesta of International Tourist Interest
- Designated: 1997

The Elche Palm Sunday Procession or Palm Procession is the commemoration of the Palm Sunday, in the Spanish city of Elche. The festival, declared of Fiesta of International Tourist Interest, re-enacts the triumphant entry of Jesus into Jerusalem.

In this procession, tens of thousands of residents from Elche accompany the throne of Triumphant Jesus (pas de la burreta) along the main streets of the city center. Participants carry the white palms handcrafted by local artisanal families and sourced from the Palmeral de Elche.

== History ==
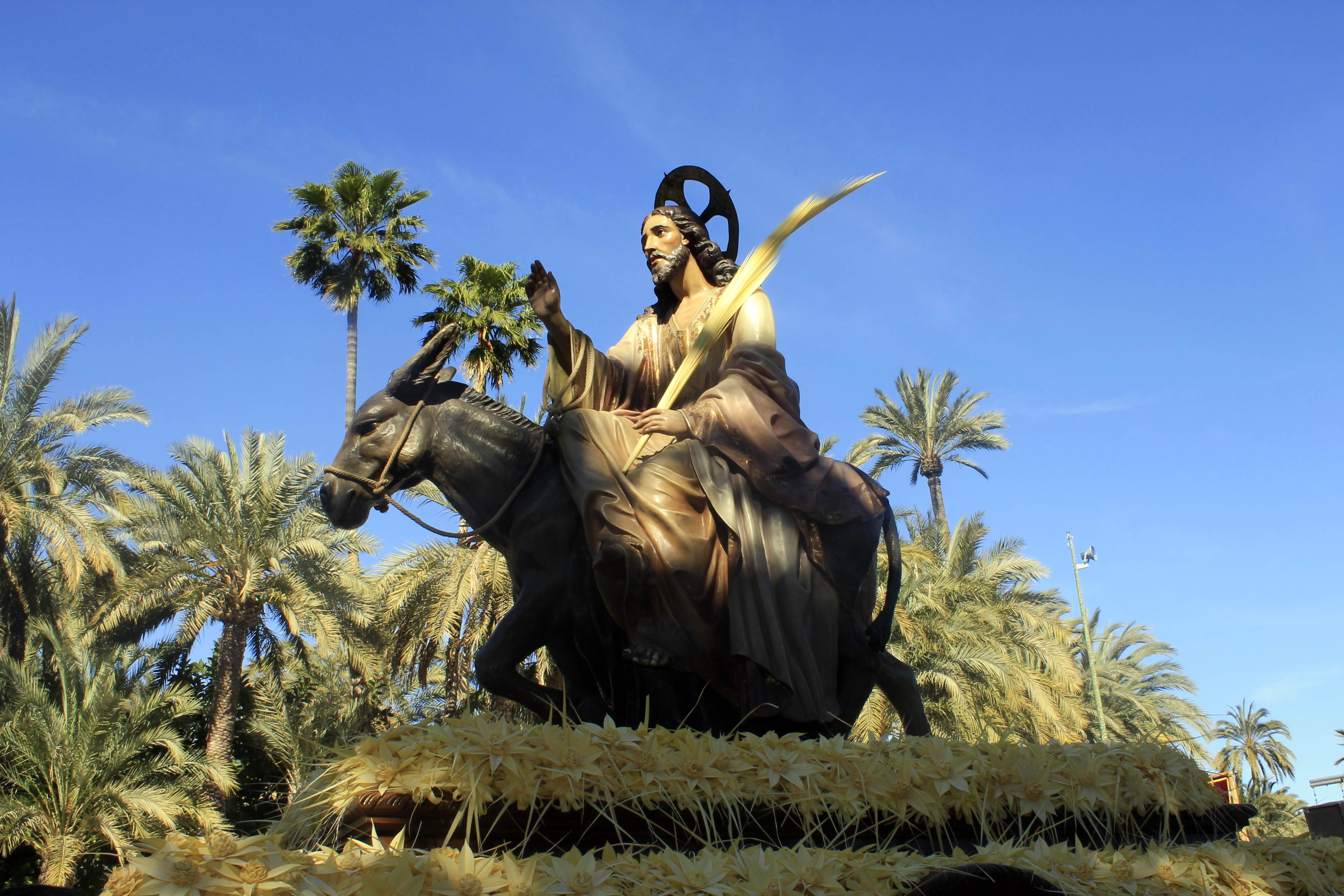
Image of Triumphant Jesus making a station of penance in Elche on Palm Sunday

The earliest record of this celebration dates back to 1371, when the Consell de la Vila (Municipal Council) joined the festivities by distributing alms. References to the commerce of the white palm are found in the documents of the Cathedral Chapter dated 1429.

== The Brotherhood ==
The brotherhood was reorganized in 1941 by Vicente Serrano. Initially, the throne and sacred items were borne by the workers of his factory. Later, control of the brotherhood was transferred to Roberto Casanova, until it was eventually assumed by the Major Board of Brotherhoods and Confraternities of Elche.

== The Processional Image ==
Our Lord Triumphant Jesus in His Triumphal Entry into Jerusalem is the work of the religious art workshop of Olot. The image represents the moment when Jesus enters Jerusalem triumphantly on a young donkey.
