= Horse racing of Sanlúcar =

Sanlúcar Horse Race Carreras de caballos de Sanlúcar
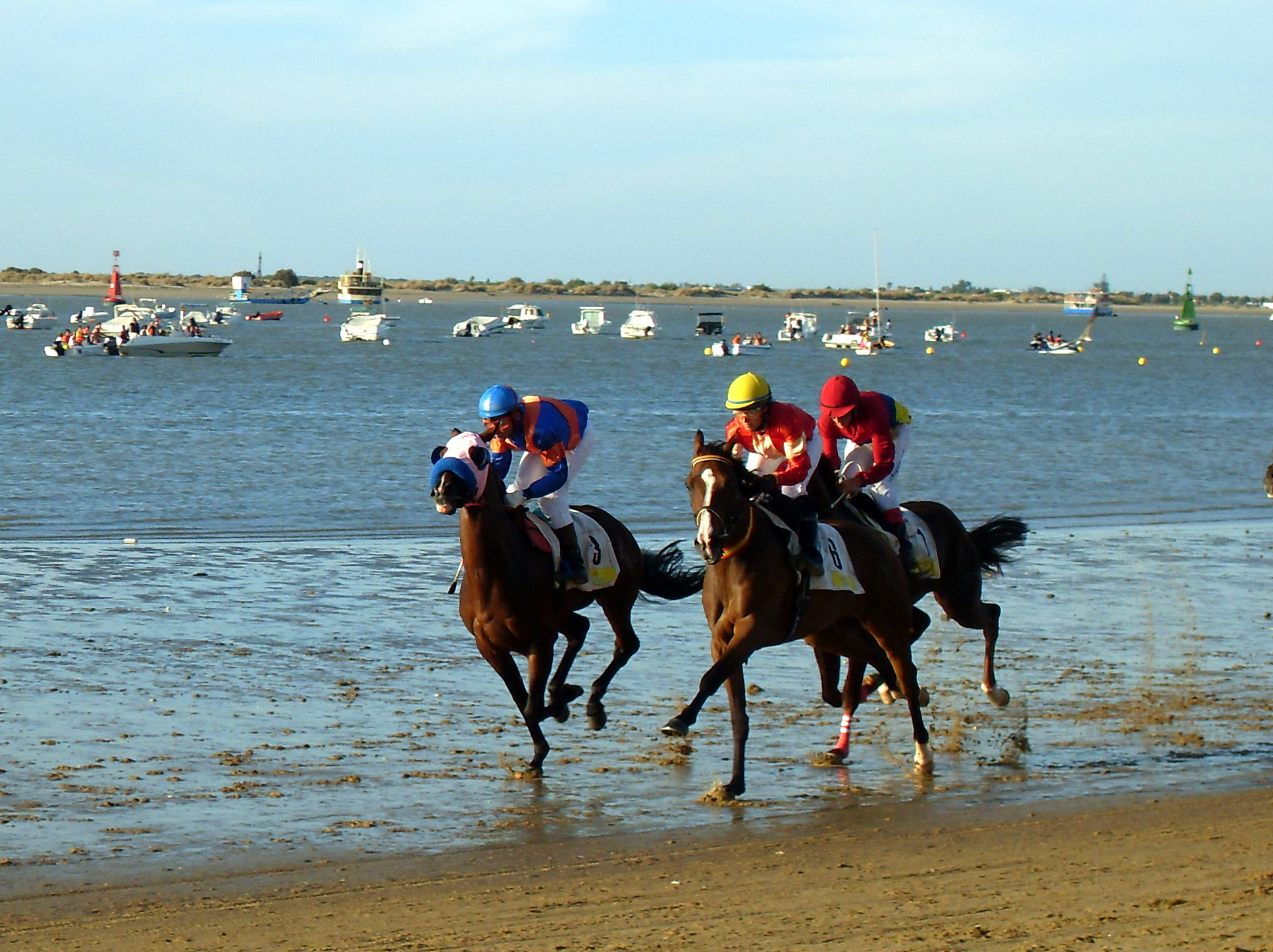
- Horse racing, August 2009
- Frequency: Annual
- Locations: Sanlúcar de Barrameda, Spain
- Inaugurated: 1845

Fiesta of International Tourist Interest
- Designated: 1997

Sanlúcar Horse Race (Spanish: Carreras de caballos de Sanlúcar) is a series horse races held annually on the beach at Spanish town of Sanlúcar de Barrameda, Andalusia. It officially dates back since the first edition in the beach town in the year 1845, when the Sociedad de Carreras de Caballos de Sanlucar de Barrameda was formed.

The race is organized by the Sociedad de Carreras de Caballos de Sanlúcar de Barrameda. This is the second horse race in English-style that took place in Spain, the first one took place in Alameda de Osuna in 1835, and it was held again in 1843 and 1849. It is declared Fiesta of Andalusian, National and International Tourist Interest. Along with the races of San Sebastián, Seville, Mijas, Dos Hermanas it is part of the Spanish equestrian circuit.

== Bibliography ==
- GARCÍA RODRÍGUEZ, José Carlos. Las carreras de caballos de Sanlúcar de Barrameda: 1845-1995, 150 aniversario. Ed. Sociedad de Carreras de Caballos de Sanlúcar de Barrameda. 1995. ISBN 84-605-2603-8
