= The Burial of the Sardine in Murcia =

Popular festivity in Murcia, Spain

The Burial of the Sardine in Murcia (Spanish: Entierro de la Sardina en Murcia) is a festivity that is celebrated in Murcia, Spain during the Spring Festival (Spanish: Fiestas de Primavera de Murcia). Since 1851, the main event of the Spring Festival has been a parade of floats and men in dresses that culminates with the burning of the sardine on the Saturday after Holy Week.The Burial recalls old pagan myths and the fire performs a cleansing function. It was declared a Fiesta of International Tourist Interest by the Ministry of Industry, Tourism and Trade of Spain.
