= Fiestas of International Tourist Interest of Spain =

Honorary distinction given by the Spanish government to various festivities

The title of Fiesta of International Tourist Interest (Spanish: Fiestas de Interés Turístico Internacional, Basque: Interes Turistiko Nazioarteko Jaiak, Catalan: Festes d'Interès Turístic Internacional / Valencian: Festes d'Interés Turístic Internacional, Galician: Festas de Interese Turístico Internacional) is an honorary distinction that is given by the General Secretariat of Tourism of the Ministry of Industry, Trade and Tourism of the Government of Spain to the fiestas, festivals or events in Spain involving manifestations of cultural and popular tradition, with particular regard to their ethnic characteristics and special importance as international tourist attractions. This honorary title was established in 1979.

== Requirements ==
The requirements to be eligible to receive this distinction include:

- Antiquity of the celebration and continuity over time (at least should be held each five years).
- Popular roots and participation, especially value the existence of associations that support it.
- Originality, diversity that are relevant in terms of promoting tourism of Spain abroad.
- Impact on international media, at least ten performances in one or more foreign media.
- Possess the declaration of National Tourist Interest for at least five years.
- That its development involve no mistreatment of people or animals, and care for the city, architecture and landscape.
- Existence in the town or within 50 km (30 mi) of suitable accommodation and tourist services.
- Full Town Council agreement and a favorable report from the Autonomous Community.

== Fiestas ==
Fiestas declared of International Tourist Interest in Spain
Image	Name	Dates	Designation	Ref.
	Carnival of Santa Cruz de Tenerife; Santa Cruz de Tenerife	Variable date on February–March	1980	
	Carnival of Cádiz; Cádiz	During the 10 days preceding Ash Wednesday	1980	
	Horse racing of Sanlúcar; Sanlúcar de Barrameda (Cádiz)	During two cycles of August depending on the tides	1997	
	Cascamorras; Baza and Guadix (Granada)	6 September	2013	
	International Habaneras and Polyphony Contest; Torrevieja (Alicante)	22–30 July	1994	
	International Sella River Descent; Arriondas and Ribadesella (Asturias)	Saturday following 2 August	1980	
	Magdalena Festival; Castellón de la Plana	From the third Saturday of Lent	2010	
	Entrada de toros y caballos Segorbe (Castellón)	Second week of September	2005	
	Falles in Valencia; Valencia	15–19 March	1980	
	Feria de Abril; Seville	Two weeks after Holy Week	1980	
	Fair of Albacete; Albacete	7–17 September	2008	
	Feria del Caballo of Jerez; Jerez de la Frontera (Cádiz)	Three weeks after Holy Week	1980	
	Festival del Cante de las Minas; La Unión (Murcia)	Eleven days after the first Wednesday of August	2006	
	The Burial of the Sardine in Murcia; Murcia	First Saturday following Holy Week	2006	
	Festas do Apóstolo Santiago; Santiago de Compostela (A Coruña)	25 July	2001	
	Bonfires of Saint John; Alicante	20–24 June	1984	
	Fiestas de la Santísima y Vera Cruz; Caravaca de la Cruz (Murcia)	1–5 May	2004	
	Moors and Christians of Alcoy; Alcoy (Alicante)	22–24 April	1980	
	Moors and Christians of Villajoyosa; Villajoyosa (Alicante)	24–31 July	2003	
	Misteri d'Elx; Elche (Alicante)	14–15 August	1980	
	Corpus Christi in Toledo; Toledo	60 days after Easter Sunday	1980	
	Procession of the Palm Sunday of Elx; Elche (Alicante)	Palm Sunday	1997	
	Pilgrimage of El Rocío; Almonte (Huelva)	Weekend of Pentecost Sunday	1980	
	Viking Festival of Catoira; Catoira (Pontevedra)	First Sunday of August	2002	
	Festival of San Fermín; Pamplona	6–14 July	1980	
	Holy Week in Palencia; Palencia	Holy Week	2012	
	Holy Week in Cartagena; Cartagena (Murcia)	Holy Week	2005	
	Holy Week in Cuenca and its Religious Music Week; Cuenca	Holy Week	1980	
	Holy Week in Hellín; Hellín (Albacete)	Holy Week	2007	
	Holy Week in León; León	Holy Week	2002	
	Holy Week in Lorca; Lorca (Murcia)	Holy Week	2007	
	Holy Week in Málaga; Málaga	Holy Week	1980	
	Holy Week in Medina de Rioseco; Medina de Rioseco (Valladolid)	Holy Week	2009	
	Holy Week in Salamanca; Salamanca	Holy Week	2003	
	Holy Week in Seville; Seville	Holy Week	1980	
	Holy Week in Granada; Granada	Holy Week	2009	
	Holy Week in Valladolid; Valladolid	Holy Week	1980	
	Holy Week in Zamora; Zamora	Holy Week	1986	
	Holy Week in Zaragoza; Zaragoza	Holy Week	2014	
	Ruta del tambor y el bombo including the Holy Weeks in Albalate del Arzobispo, Alcañiz, Alcorisa, Andorra, Calanda, Híjar, la Puebla de Híjar, Samper de Calanda and Urrea de Gaén (Teruel)	Holy Week	2014	
	La Tomatina; Buñol (Valencia)	Last Wednesday of August	2002	
	Corpus Christi in Ponteareas; Ponteareas (Pontevedra)	60 days after Easter Sunday	2009	
	Holy Week in Orihuela; Orihuela (Alicante)	Holy Week	2010	
	Holy Week in Viveiro; Viveiro (Lugo)	Holy Week	2013	
	Rapa das Bestas of Sabucedo; A Estrada (Pontevedra)	First Friday–Monday of July	2007	
	Festa do Albariño; Cambados (Pontevedra)	First Sunday of August	2018	
	Ortigueira's Festival of Celtic World; Ortigueira (A Coruña)	29 July	2005	
	Carnival of Las Palmas; Las Palmas	Variable date on February–March	2023	
	Fiestas del Pilar; Zaragoza	12 October	2019	
	Arde Lucus; Lugo	Last weeks of June	2023	
	La Arribada; Baiona (Pontevedra)	First weekend of March	2015	
	Cantabrian Wars Fest; Los Corrales de Buelna (Cantabria)	Last weekend of August and first of September	2019	
	Fiestas of the Mutiny; Aranjuez (Madrid)	First week of September	2014	
	Holy Week in Cáceres; Cáceres	Holy Week	2011	
	Holy Week in Mérida; Mérida (Badajoz)	Holy Week	2018	
	Holy Week in Ávila; Ávila	Holy Week	2014	
	Carthaginians and Romans; Cartagena (Murcia)	Second half of September	2017	
	Running of the bulls in Cuéllar; Cuéllar (Segovia)	Last weekend of August	2018	
	Corpus Christi in Béjar; Béjar (Salamanca)	60 days after Easter Sunday	2019	
	Holy Week in Cieza; Cieza (Murcia)	Holy Week	2023	
	Carnival of Badajoz; Badajoz	Variable date on February–March	2022	
	Holy Week in Ferrol; Ferrol (A Coruña)	Holy Week	2014	
	Holy Week in Jumilla; Jumilla (Murcia)	Holy Week	2019	
	Carnival of Águilas; Águilas (Murcia)	Variable date on February–March	2015	
	Holy Week in Murcia; Murcia	Holy Week	2011	
	Bando de la Huerta; Murcia	Tuesday following Holy Week	2012	
	Holy Week in Crevillente; Crevillente (Alicante)	Holy Week	2011	
	All Saints' Fair; Cocentaina (Alicante)	All Saints' Day	2019	
	Holy Week in Medina del Campo; Medina del Campo (Valladolid)	Holy Week	2011	
	Jerez Grape Harvest Fest; Jerez de la Frontera (Cádiz)	Two weeks in September	1980	
	Fiesta del Cocido; Lalín (Pontevedra)	Sunday preceding Carnival	2020	
	Fiesta del Pulpo; O Carballiño (Ourense)	Second weekend of August	2022	
	Fiesta de la Lamprea; Arbo (Pontevedra)	Last weekend of April	2023	
	Carnival of Xinzo de Limia; Xinzo de Limia (Ourense)	Variable date on February–March	2019	
	Bonfires of Saint John; A Coruña	23–24 June	2015	
	Fiestas Mayores; Almansa (Albacete)	First week of May	2019	
	The Night of the Drums; Mula (Murcia)	Holy Wednesday	2022	
	Magical Autumn; Ambroz Valley (Cáceres)	Late October–early December	2024	
	Moors and Christians of Ontinyent; Ontinyent (Valencia)	Late August	2024	
	Moors and Christians of Crevillente; Crevillente (Alicante)	Early October	2017	
	Holy Week in Toledo; Toledo	Holy Week	2014	
	Fiestas de la Virgen; Yecla (Murcia)	5–15 December	2024	
	Holy Week in Badajoz; Badajoz	Holy Week	2025	
	Moors and Christians of Murcia; Murcia	Early September	2025	
	Botillo Festival; Bembibre (León)	Early February	2025	
	The Weddings of Isabel de Segura; Teruel	Late February	2025	
	Holy Week in Baena; Baena (Córdoba)	Holy Week	2025	
	Moors and Christians of Elda; Elda (Alicante)	Late May–early June	2026	
	Ruta de la Pasión Calatrava; Campo de Calatrava (Ciudad Real)	Holy Week	2026	

== See also ==
- Fiestas of National Tourist Interest of Spain
