= Jatiel =

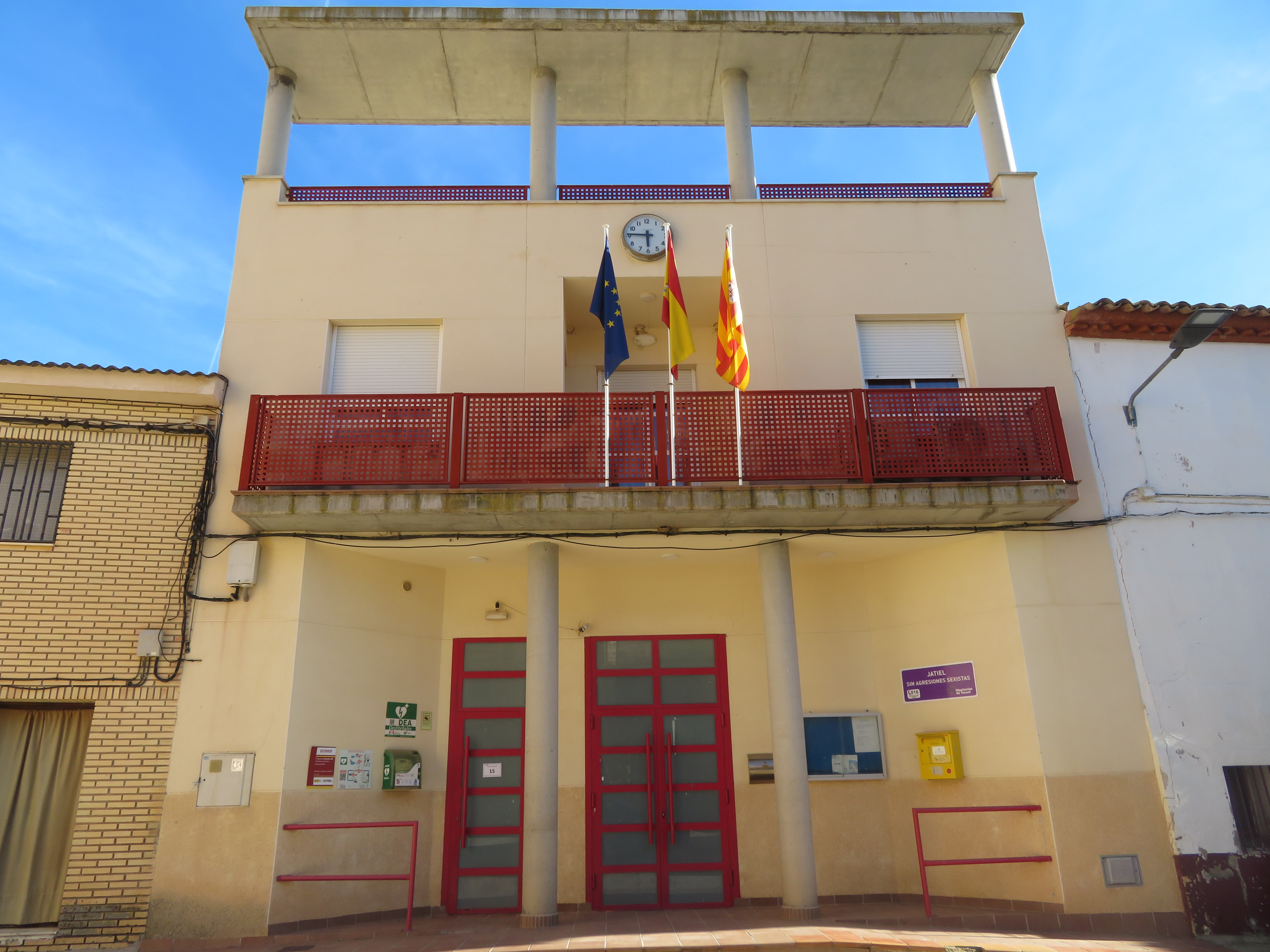
- Town hall

- Flag Coat of arms

- Location within Spain
- Coordinates: 41°13′N 0°23′W
- Country: Spain
- Autonomous community: Aragon
- Province: Teruel
- Comarca: Bajo Martín

Area
  - Total: 11 km^{2} (4.2 sq mi)
- Elevation: 209 m (686 ft)

Population (2025-01-01)
  - Total: 48
  - Density: 4.4/km^{2} (11/sq mi)
- Time zone: UTC+1 (CET)
  - Summer (DST): UTC+2 (CEST)

Jatiel is a municipality located in the Bajo Martín comarca, province of Teruel, Aragon, Spain. According to the 2010 census the municipality has a population of 52 inhabitants. Its postal code is 44592.

It is an agricultural town, reputed for the quality of the local peaches.

== See also ==
- Bajo Martín
- List of municipalities in Teruel
