= Corpus Christi in Toledo =

Corpus Christi in Toledo, Spain is an annual Corpus Christi procession that is one of Toledo’s most important religious celebrations, recognized since 1980 as a Fiesta of International Tourist Interest.
