= Holy Week in Cuenca =

Annual religious event in Cuenca, Spain

Coordinates: 40.0717°N 2.1350°W

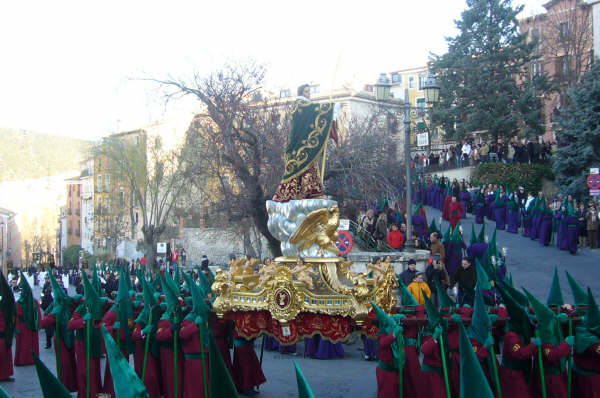
- Official name: Semana Santa de Cuenca
- Observed by: Cuenca, Spain
- Type: Religious, Historical, Cultural
- Significance: Commemoration of the passion, death and resurrection of Jesus
- Celebrations: Processions
- Begins: Palm Sunday
- Ends: Easter Sunday
- 2025 date: April 13 - April 20
- 2026 date: March 29 - April 5
- 2027 date: March 21 - March 28
- 2028 date: April 9 - April 16
- Frequency: Annual

Holy Week in Cuenca (Semana Santa de Cuenca) is the most important religious event of Cuenca, Spain. It is celebrated in the week leading up to Easter (Holy Week among Christians). As a reflection of its cultural, historic and spiritual importance, Holy Week in Cuenca was declared Fiesta of International Tourist Interest of Spain.

== The Pasos ==
The Pasos are the core of the festival. They consist of a wooden sculpture or group of sculptures that narrates a scene from the Passion of Christ. Porters called Banceros carry them on a platform or staves.

== The Processions ==
Processions are the main event of Semana Santa in Cuenca. Every fraternity organizes its own procession. Generally, the processions move through the city center, from their home Church to the Cathedral and Plaza Mayor or surrounding areas. A few exceptions to the 'standard' routing make every parade unique.

Some of the most important Procession are:

- Procession of the Hosanna
- Procession of the Vera Cruz
- Procession of El Perdon
- Procession of El Silencio
- Procession of Paz y Caridad
- Procession of Camino del Calvario (on Good Friday)
- Procession of En el Calvario
- Procession of Santo Entierro
- Procession of El duelo
- Procession of El Encuentro

== Music ==
The ‘Religious Music Week’ has been running for almost 60 years and is one of the oldest musical festivals in Spain.
