= Cascamorras =

Annual festival in Granada, Spain

Fiesta de Cascamorras
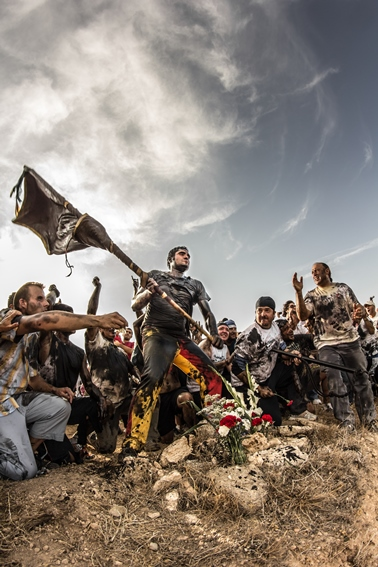
- Date: 6 September
- Frequency: Annually
- Locations: Guadix and Baza (Granada), Spain

Fiesta of International Tourist Interest
- Designated: 2013

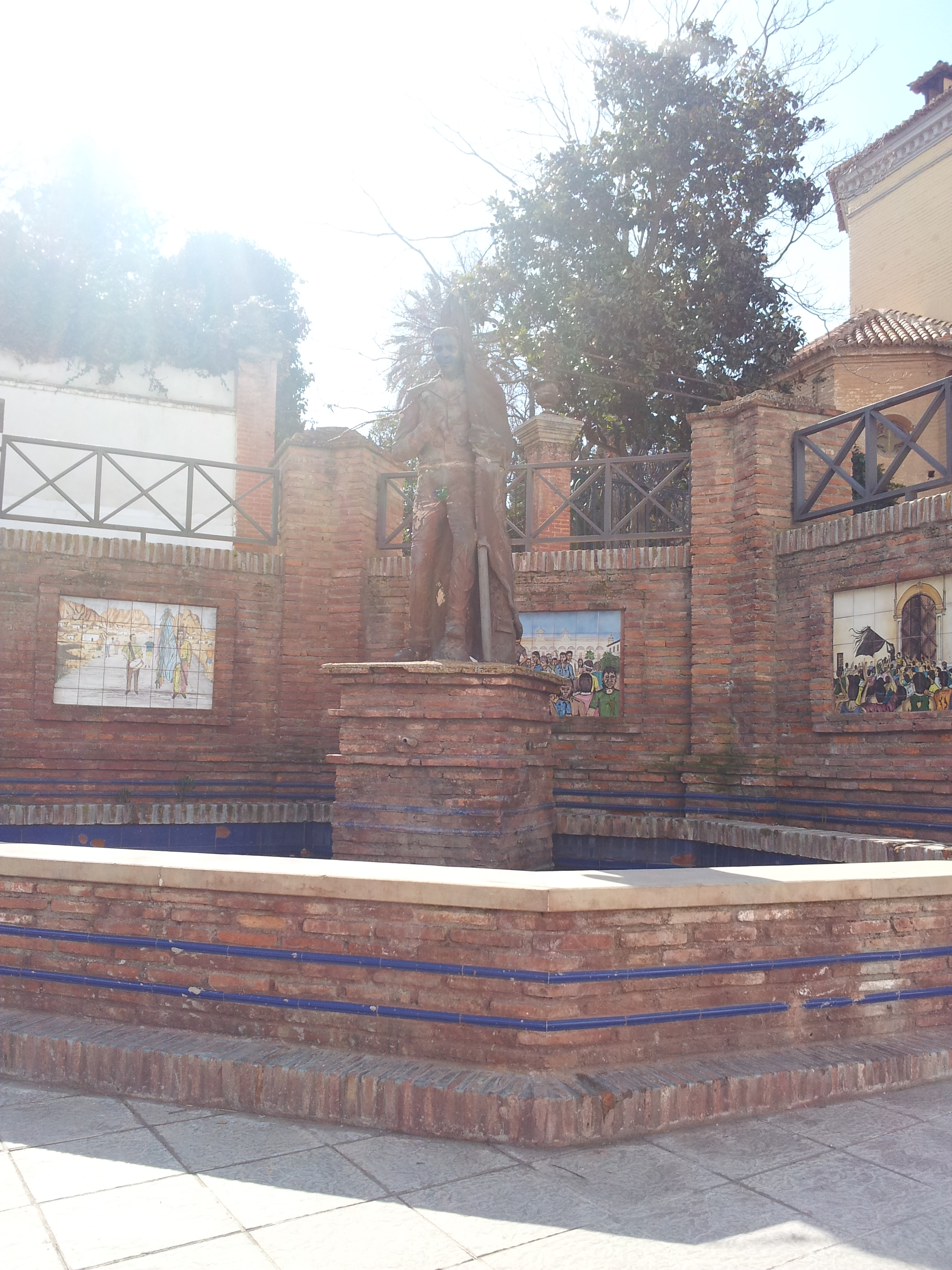
Statue of Cascamorras in Guadix

The Fiesta de Cascamorras is a festival that takes place in the towns of Guadix and Baza in the province of Granada, Spain, annually on September 6. The two towns fight for possession of a statue of the Virgen de la Piedad. In 2013, the festival was declared a Fiestas of International Tourist Interest of Spain.

== History ==
Guadix and Baza are two Andalusian towns in the Province of Granada, neighbors, sisters and rivals. Cascamorras, a worker from Guadix, found a buried sacred image of the Virgen de la Piedad (Our Lady of Mercy) while working on the land of Baza. Encouraged by his Guadixan countrymen, he attempted to carry the sacred image to Guadix, but Bazans snatched it before he arrived, punishing what they considered a sacred theft. When Cascamorras returned to Guadix empty-handed, his countrymen, who expected the image of the Virgin, were deeply disappointed and viciously pursued those they considered responsible for their frustration. Finally, hero and people reconciled, they prayed to the Virgin who was in the other town. Since then, recalling those events that unite and oppose them, Baza and Guadix celebrate the Fiesta de Cascamorras for three days in the late summer of each year.

== See also ==
- Spanish culture
- Traditions
