= Alcorisa =

- municipality
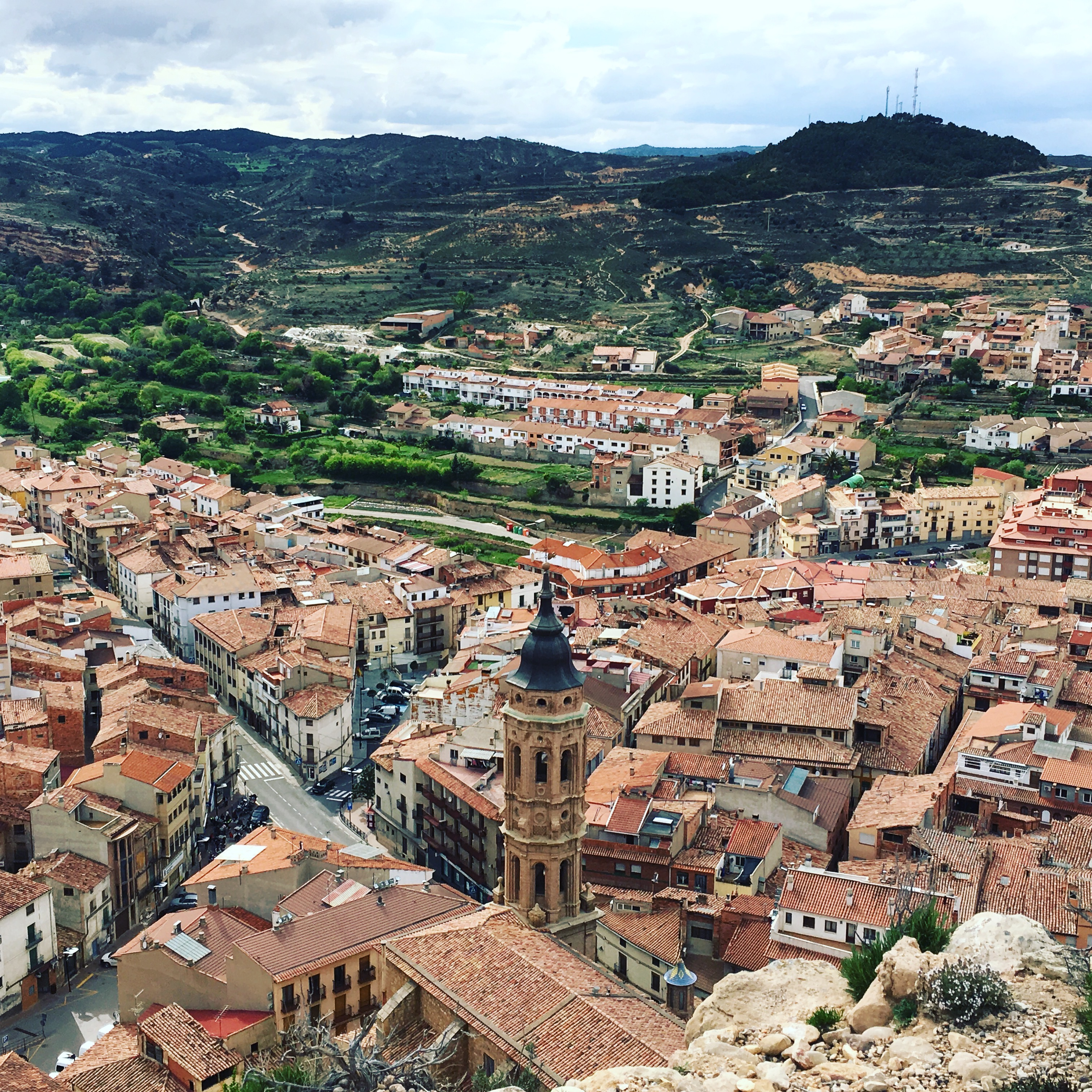

- Flag Coat of arms

- Location within Spain
- Coordinates: 40°53′N 0°23′W
- Country: Spain
- Autonomous community: Aragon
- Province: Teruel
- Comarca: Bajo Aragón

Area
  - Total: 121.20 km^{2} (46.80 sq mi)
- Elevation: 632 m (2,073 ft)

Population (2025-01-01)
  - Total: 3,243
  - Density: 26.76/km^{2} (69.30/sq mi)
- Demonyms: Alcorisano, Alcorisana
- Time zone: UTC+1 (CET)
  - Summer (DST): UTC+2 (CEST)

Alcorisa is a municipality in the province of Teruel, Aragon, Spain. According to the 2018 census the municipality has a population of 3,276 inhabitants.

Alcorisa is located right by the N-211 road, 13 km (8.1 mi) to the SW of Calanda. This town is part of the Ruta del tambor y el bombo.

== History ==
During the Spanish Civil War, the town participated in the Spanish revolution and was collectivised by the CNT.

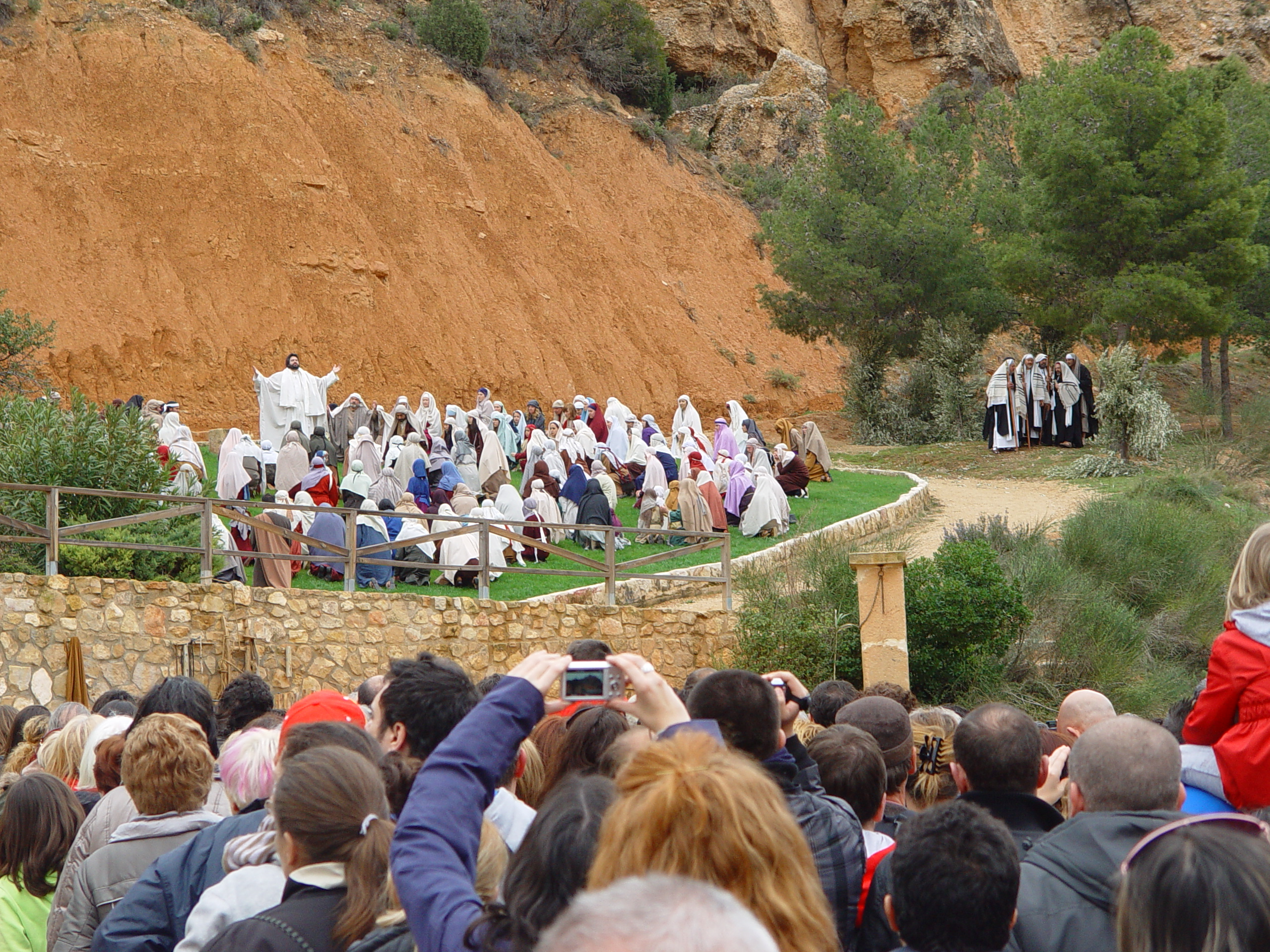
Drama de la Cruz, Monte Calvario, Alcorisa. Part of Ruta del Tambor y el Bombo

== See also ==
- Bajo Aragón
- List of municipalities in Teruel
