= Feria de Jerez =

Festival of Jerez de la Frontera, Cádiz, Spain

Fair of Jerez / Jerez Horse Fair Feria de Jerez / Feria del Caballo
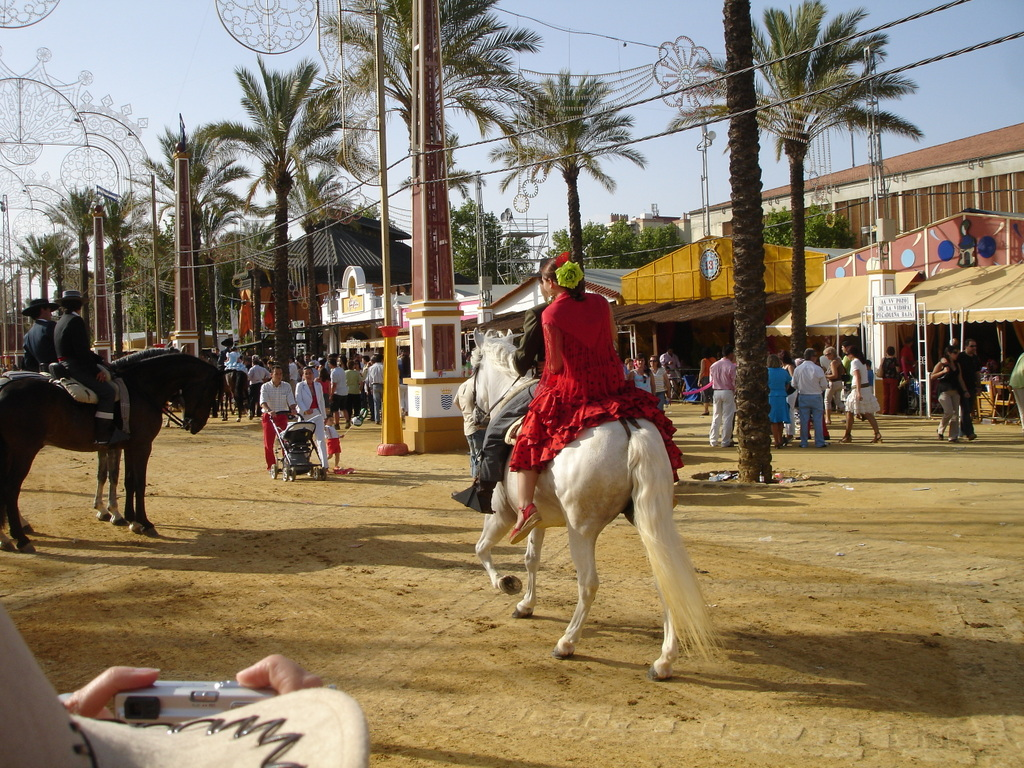
- Horse riding.
- Dates: May, one week after Feria de Abril, of Sevilla and before El Rocío.
- Locations: Parque González Hontoria, Jerez de la Frontera
- Coordinates: 36°41′47.3″N 6°07′37.1″W
- Country: Spain
- Founded: 1879
- Most recent: 17−24 May 2025
- Next event: 9−16 May 2026

Fiesta of International Tourist Interest
- Designated: 1980
- Interactive map: https://laferiadejerez.es/

Feria de Jerez, also known as Feria del Caballo (literally Horse Fair), is a celebration in the Spanish municipality Jerez de la Frontera, traditionally held in the first or second week of May. It is the most important fair in the Province of Cádiz and is listed as one of the Fiestas of International Tourist Interest of Spain by the Ministry of Industry (Spain). It was last held between the 17th and 24th of May 2025.

== History ==
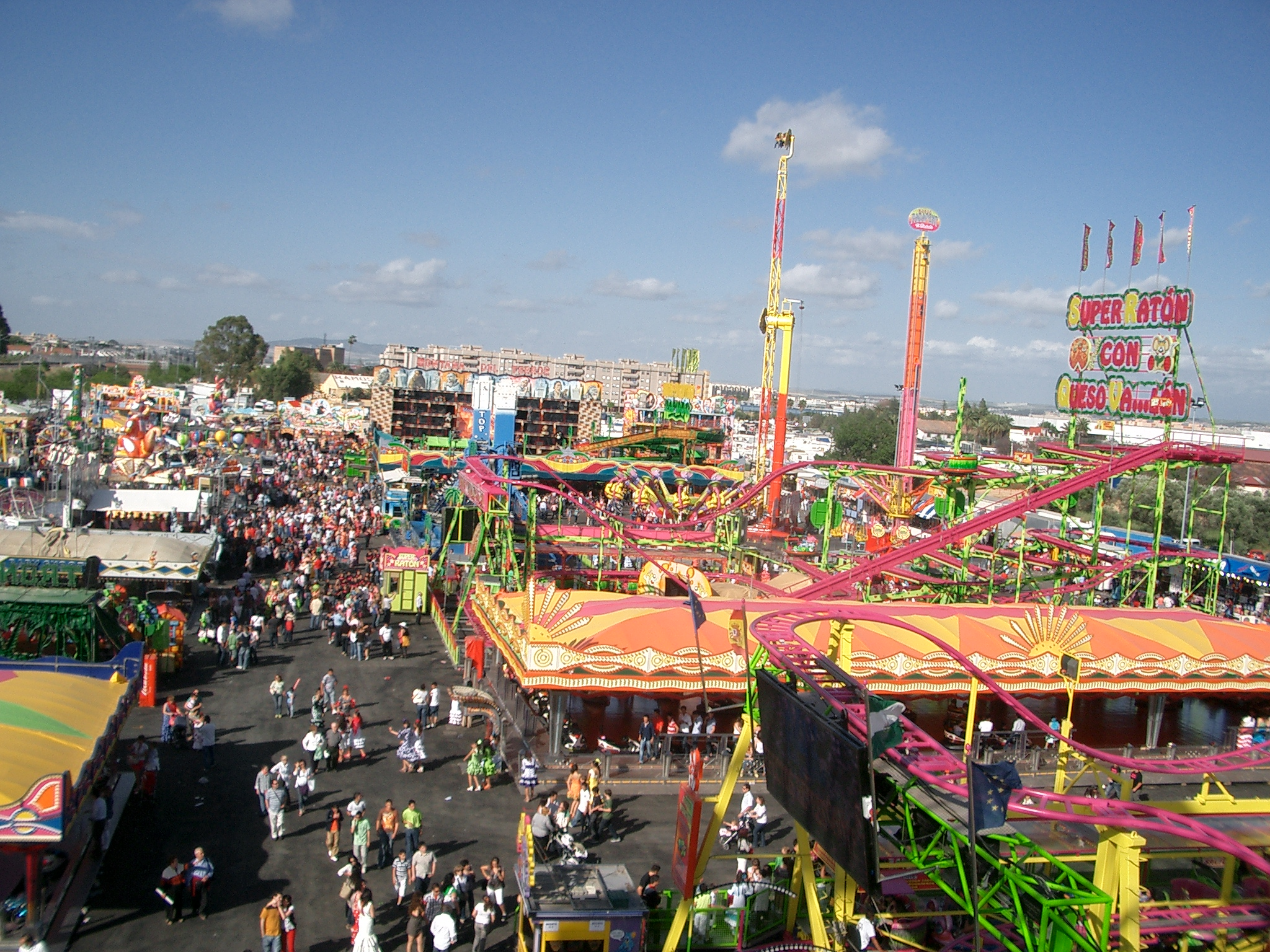
Upper view of games zone in Feria 2009 from the noria.

Its origins are in the medieval ages, during one week farmers gathered to sell and buy beautiful animals in Jerez, mainly beautiful horses, usually drinking to celebrate the deals. The origin of the fair of Jerez, occurs in the years of the Castilian conquest. Alfonso X carried out the policy of granting a cattle fair to the cities he occupied, to help activate the local economy. In the case of Jerez, the cattle fair was established in the second half of the thirteenth century, specifically some historians point to 1264, shortly after the definitive Castilian conquest of the city. In the nineteenth century, the first variations around the concept of the fair occurred. From a cattle fair, it evolves into an exhibition model, specifically in 1856. In 1867 a Special Commission of Fairs was created.

== Celebration ==
Nowadays it is celebrated in Parque González Hontoria (Jerez). It is always celebrated in the second week of May and before El Rocío.

The fair of Jerez since its origins is celebrated around the horse, still maintaining the contests of hooks and coachmen, activities of harassment and demolition with brave bulls, morphological contests of horses and other activities related to the equine world.

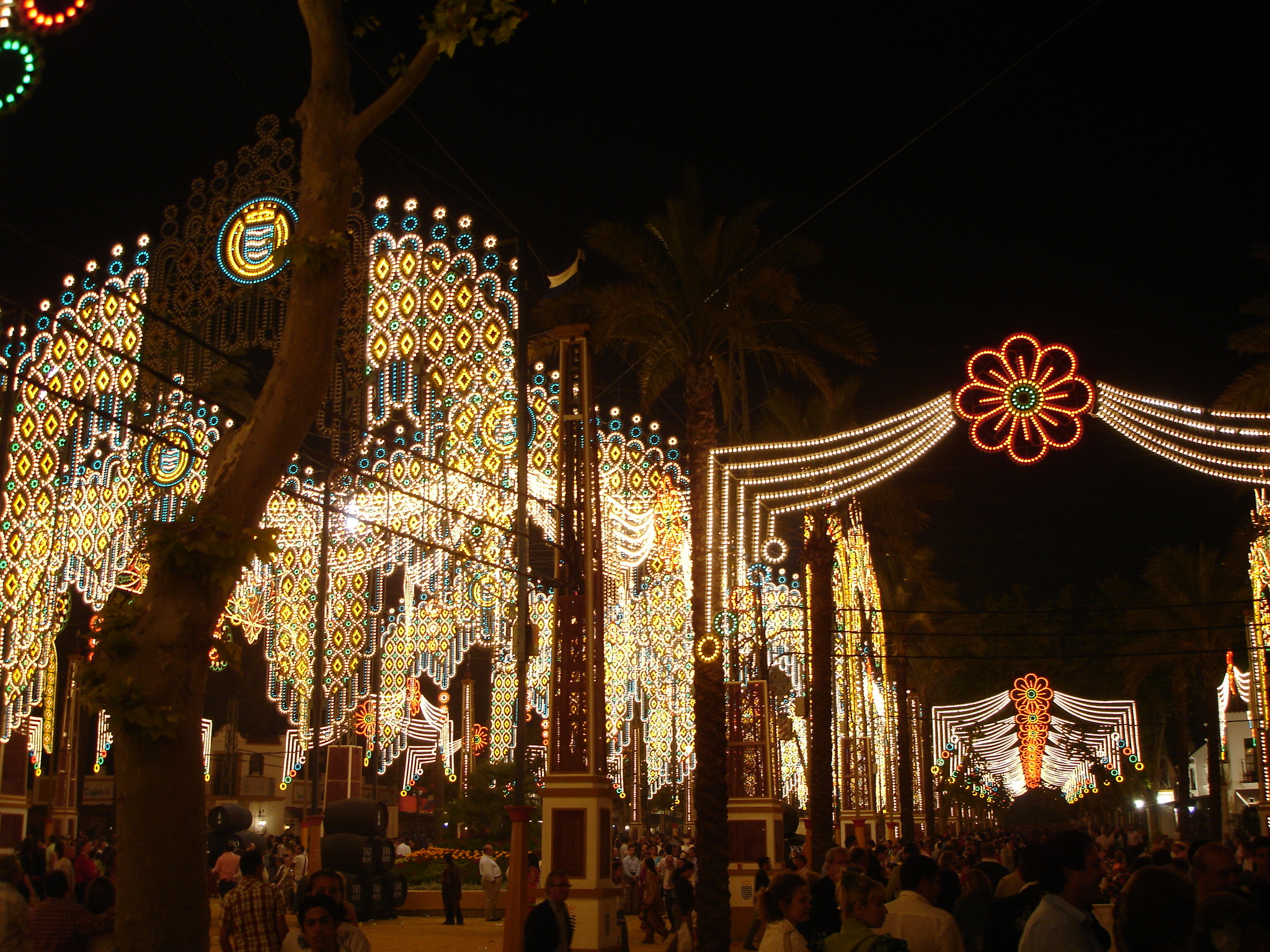
Feria at night.

The Feria is divided in two parts: one is a kind of small village, with streets that have bars and restaurants at both sides (these restaurants are called Casetas). The other is a Theme Park/carnival style area where kids and adults can have fun on different rides such as roller coasters, bumper cars etc...

At the Feria de Jerez all the casetas are public, so anyone can walk into any one and enjoy the food, drinks, and dancing. This is one of the main features that differentiates it from the Seville Fair as most of the "casetas" there are private and therefore only card holding members are allowed in, except horses.

In the casetas, throughout the day and night, people will usually be found drinking fino sherry, and in more recent years a new trend is to mix the fino with lemonade and ice cubes creating a cocktail commonly known as Rebujito.

At night time there is a sort of "roof" of decorative lights lighting the "village" area, which allows the party to last all the way until dawn.

== Gallery ==
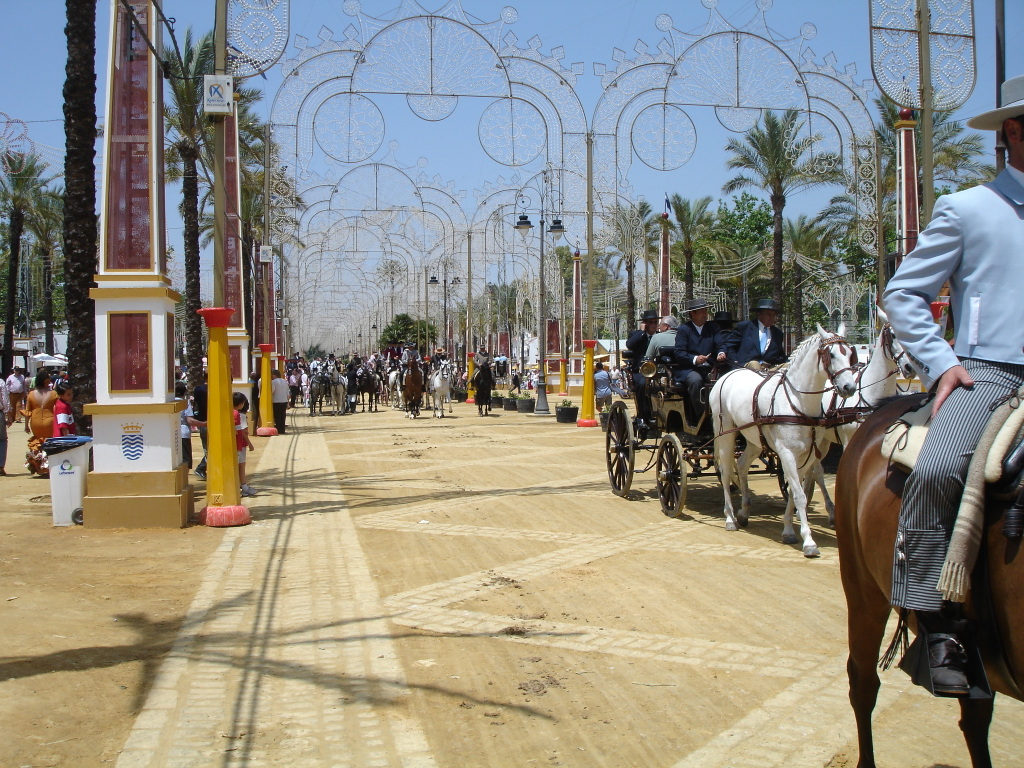
Horse race.

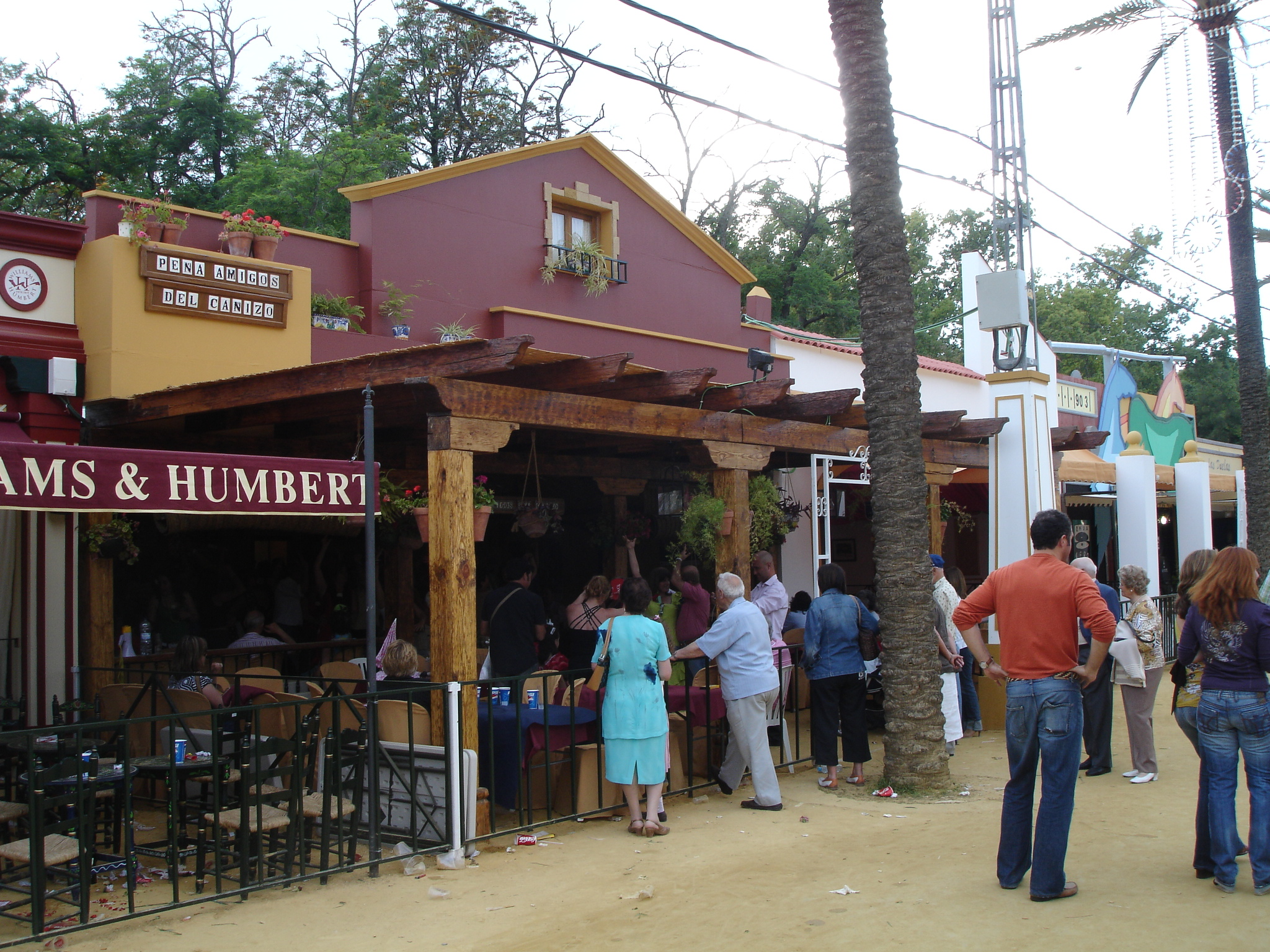
Caseta

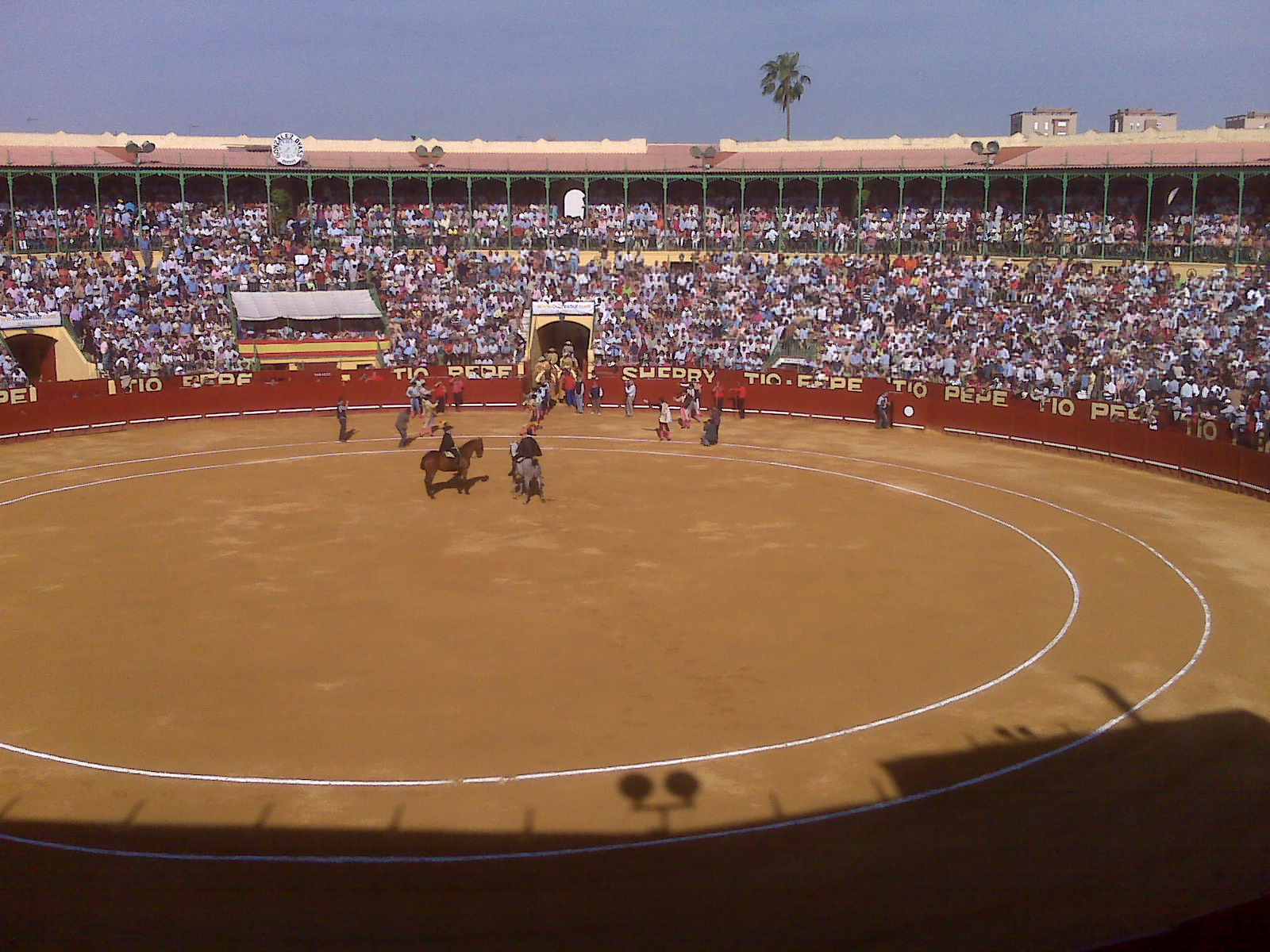
Bullfight.

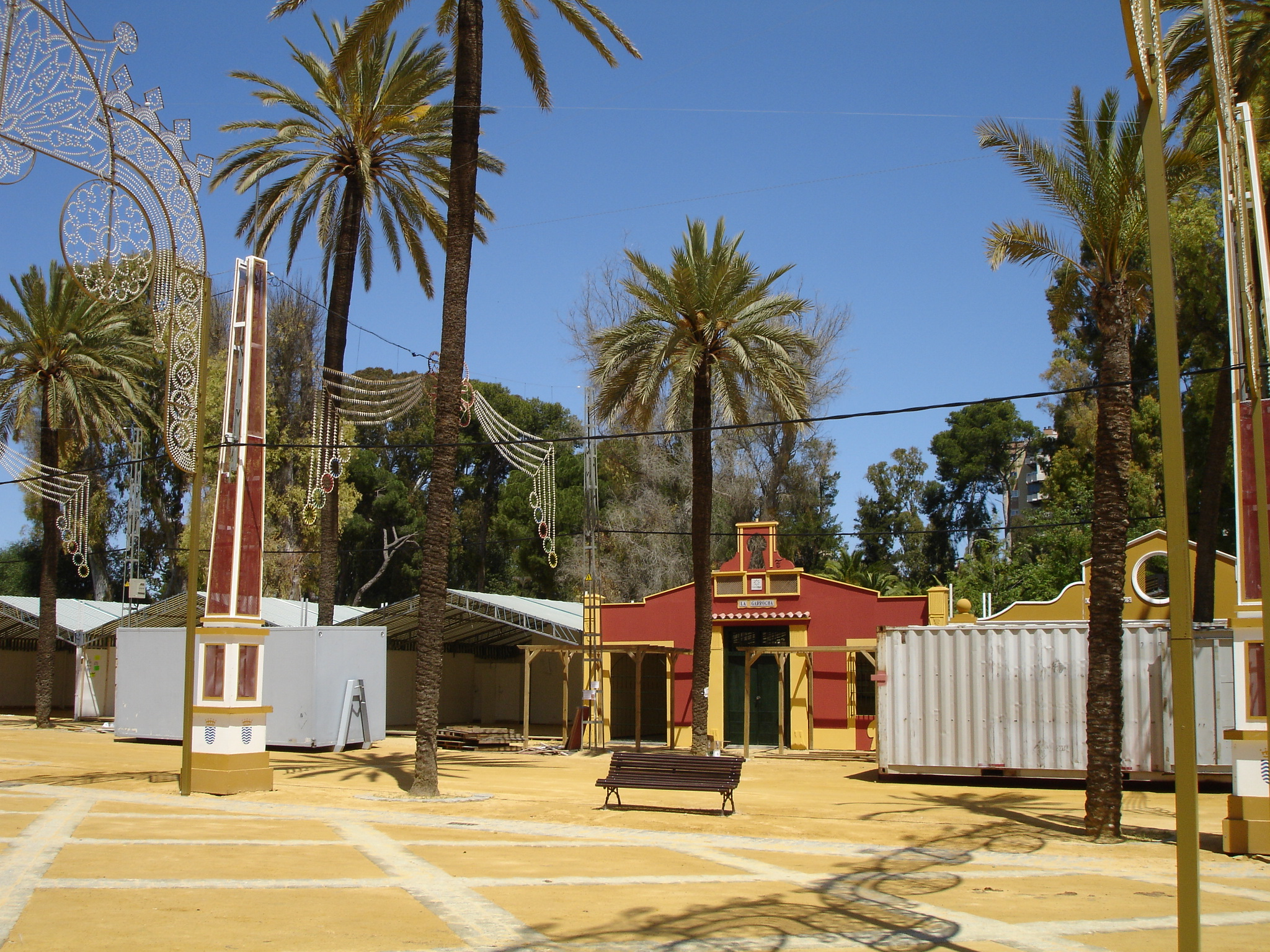
Building casetas.

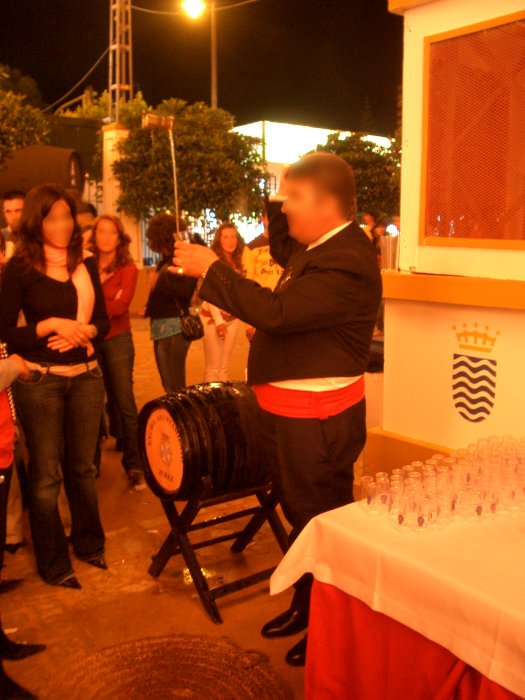
Venenciador serving sherry in Feria.
