= Vinaceite =

- municipality
- Coat of arms

- Location within Spain
- Coordinates: 41°16′N 0°35′W
- Country: Spain
- Autonomous community: Aragon
- Province: Teruel
- Municipality: Vinaceite

Area
  - Total: 50.07 km^{2} (19.33 sq mi)
- Elevation: 303 m (994 ft)

Population (2025-01-01)
  - Total: 176
  - Density: 3.52/km^{2} (9.10/sq mi)
- Time zone: UTC+1 (CET)
  - Summer (DST): UTC+2 (CEST)

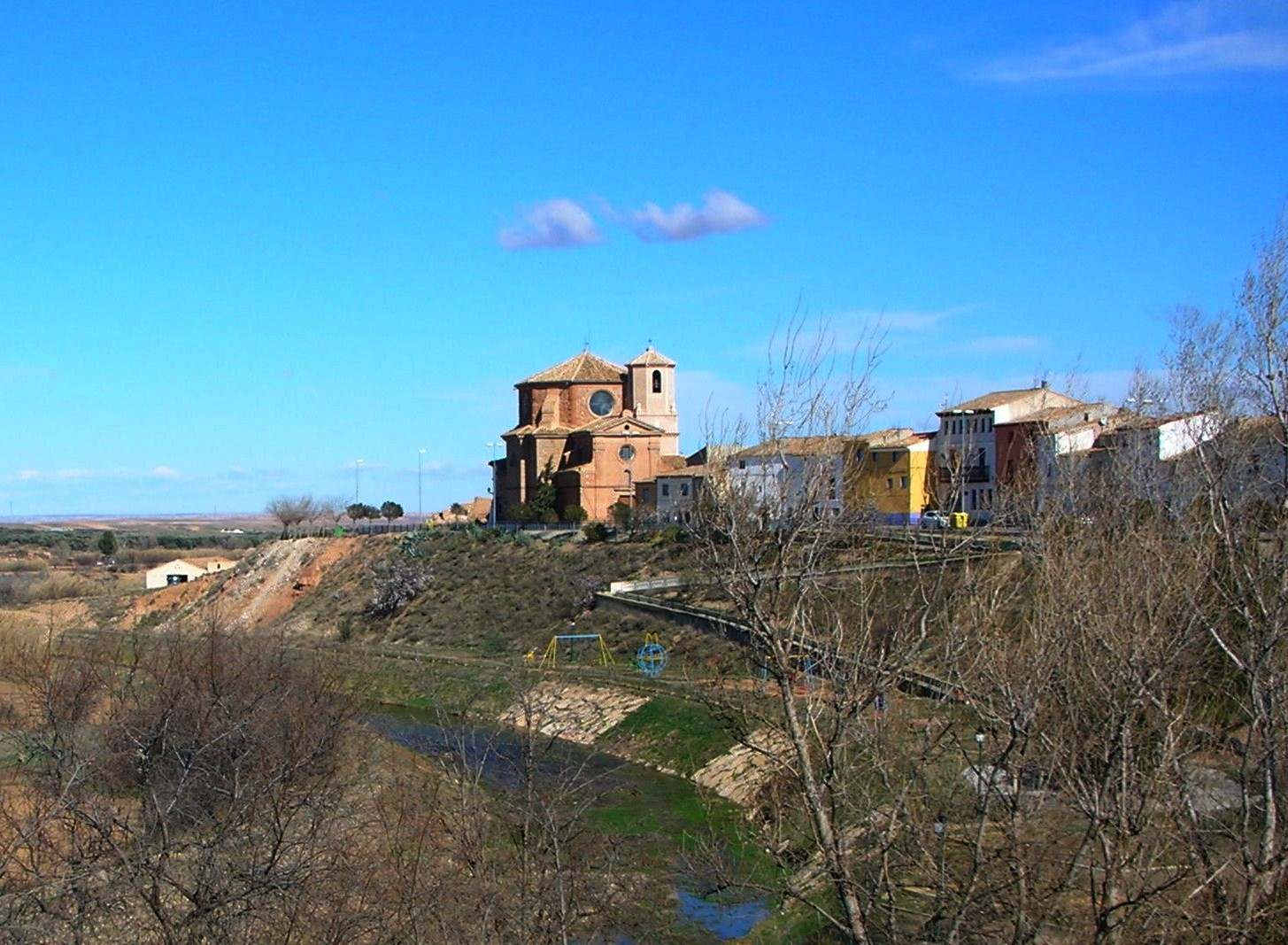
View of Vinaceite in the afternoon

Vinaceite is a municipality located in the Bajo Martín comarca, province of Teruel, Aragon, Spain. According to the 2004 census (INE), the municipality had a population of 281 inhabitants.

== See also ==
- List of municipalities in Teruel
