= Fair of Albacete =

- Feria de Albacete (Spanish)
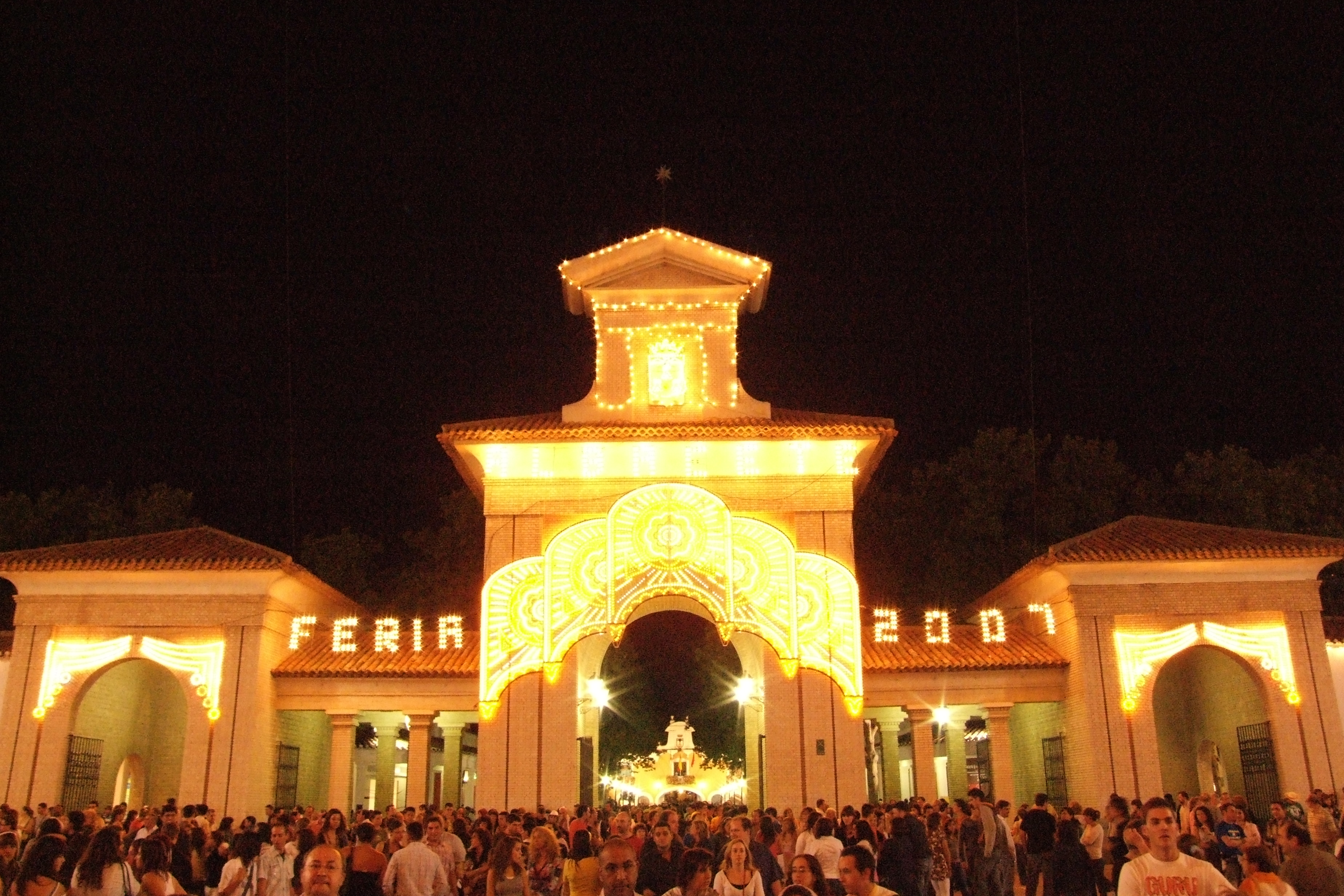

- Location within Spain
- 38.997191°N 1.870404°W
- Location: Albacete, Castilla la Mancha Spain

Spanish Cultural Heritage
- Official name: Feria de Albacete
- Type: Non-movable

The Fair of Albacete (Spanish: recinto Ferial de Albacete) is a trade fairground located in Albacete, Spain.
