= Azaila =

Azaila, Aragón, Spain
- municipality
- Flag Coat of arms

- Location within Spain
- Coordinates: 41°17′N 0°29′W
- Country: Spain
- Autonomous community: Aragon
- Province: Teruel
- Comarca: Bajo Martín

Government
  - Mayor: Adolfo Tesán Bielsa (PSOE de Aragón) (2015–2019)

Area
  - Total: 81.44 km^{2} (31.44 sq mi)
- Elevation: 276 m (906 ft)

Population (2025-01-01)
  - Total: 94
- Demonym: Azalaino
- Time zone: UTC+1 (CET)
  - Summer (DST): UTC+2 (CEST)

Azaila is a municipality of Teruel province in the autonomous community of Aragon, Spain. It covers an area of 81.44 km^{2} and in 2015 had a population of 116 inhabitants (INE).

Near Azaila lie the ruins of the ancient Iberian village of Cabezo de Alcalá.

== History ==
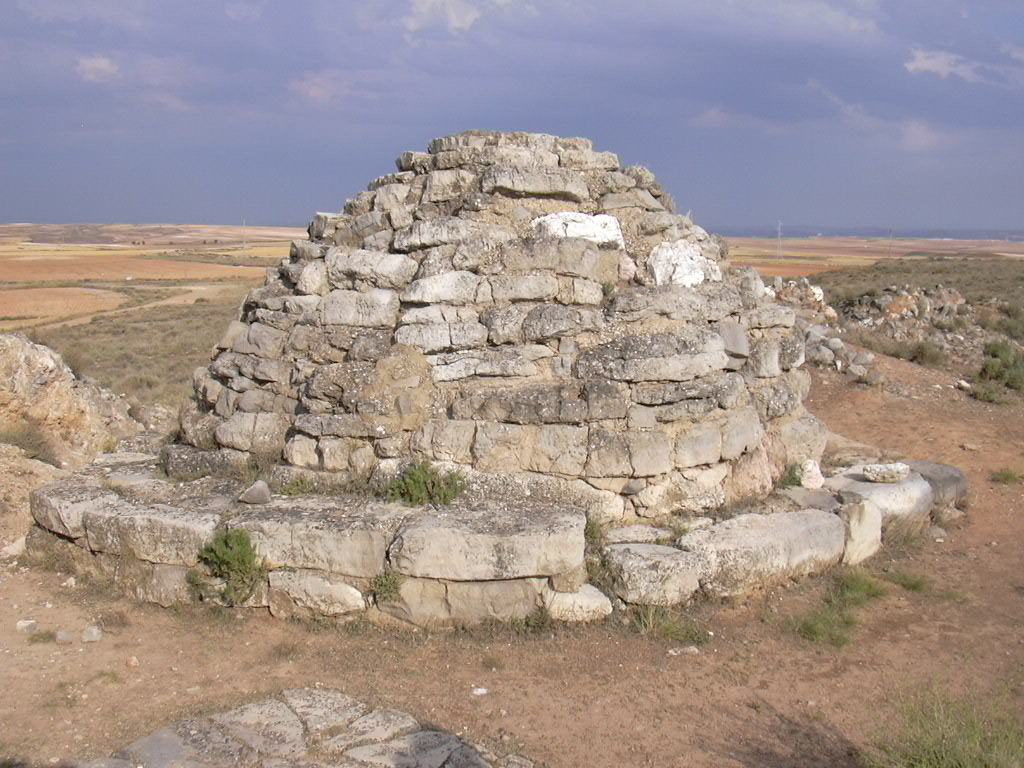
Iberian tomb near Azaila

The village of Azaila lies on the right bank of the River Aguasvivas, in the Bajo Martín region.

The name (shown as Zaylla in medieval texts) derives from Arabic and means "the flat".

The first settlements were in the village of Cabezo de Alcalá, by the River Aguasvivas, towards Vinaceite, where many different archaeological excavations have provided the stratigraphy of three successive occupations in the village. The first settlers came from central Europe (between the 7th century BC and 218 BC), followed by the Iberians and then the Romans, in the period running from 218 BC to 72 BC, before its final occupation, over the previous remains. It was destroyed between 76 and 72 BC during the Sertorian battles, although other studies have suggested a later date (49 BC), after the battle of Ilerda.

Recently, a medieval Christian necropolis was discovered in the outskirts of the community, near to the ruins of a small medieval fort. It has been dated to some time between the 8th and 16th centuries.

Apart from its name, which is a reference to the plain that extends to the south-east, very little is known about the Muslim settlement.

After the Aragonese occupation at the end of the 12th century, the land was bestowed to aristocrats. In 1196, King Pedro II gave Azaila to Gastón de Castellote, who, together with his family, continued to own the land in 1283.

The names of Romana and Azaila were established in 1215 and 1285 from two of the many terms used during the 8th century. At the end of the 14th century, Azaila was owned by Gastón de Rueda and in the beginning of the 17th century, in 1610, by Pedro de Lanuza.

From a political and administrative point of view, Azaila was included in the Sobrecullida of Zaragoza (1488-1495), Vereda of Zaragoza (1646) and Corregimiento of Alcañiz (1711-1833), mentioned as a village in 1495 and 1785, with its own council, probably from 1834. It was run by the district of Híjar, later to be incorporated in 1965 to the district of Alcañiz. In the new regional organisation, established by the Diputación General de Aragón (the Aragonese government), it is included in the Bajo Martín region.

Its parish is dedicated to Nuestra Señora del Rosario (Our Lady of the Rosary), although according to studies published by Pascual Madoz in the mid-19th century and professor Antonio, it was originally dedicated to Saint Peter the Martyr.

The architecture dates from the 17th century, baroque style, which was commissioned by the Dukes of Híjar, whose shield can be seen above the church door. The work is basically masonry and brick, incorporating a closed nave with a semi-annular vault with lunettes, and at the head of the church is a tower with five bodies. After the summer of 1936 all of the interior decoration disappeared, although it has recently been recovered.

With respect to the population, 20 homes were registered in 1489, which had reduced to 12 by 1495. All of them were Muslim. After the ejection of the Moors, the community was left almost empty, with 86 homes abandoned. 430 people, as recorded in transition 11, joined at Azaila with people from neighbouring communities of Cuarte and Rodén, before continuing to Samper de Calanda, a distance of three leagues, and then passing through Caspe and Maella, the last settlement in Aragon. From there they travelled to the port of Los Alfaques, to the south of Tortosa, from which they sailed to the north of Africa.

From the record of the homes in 1645 until 1718 the population remained constant with 8 homes, with 72 people in 1776.

During the mid-19th century, according to Pascual Madoz, Azaila had 100 houses, 116 neighbours and 467 souls, with a stable population of around 400 neighbours. From 1970 to the last third of the 20th century, there were 363 inhabitants, at which point a steady drop of the population commenced, to the beginning of the 21st century when the population was around 200 people.

Nowadays, the economic activity centres on agriculture.

== See also ==
- List of municipalities in Teruel
