= Urrea de Gaén =

Urrea de Gaén, Spain
- Flag Coat of arms

- Location within Spain
- Coordinates: 41°10′N 0°28′W
- Country: Spain
- Autonomous community: Aragon
- Province: Teruel
- Municipality: Urrea de Gaén

Area
  - Total: 41.42 km^{2} (15.99 sq mi)
- Elevation: 308 m (1,010 ft)

Population (2025-01-01)
  - Total: 455
  - Density: 11.0/km^{2} (28.5/sq mi)
- Time zone: UTC+1 (CET)
  - Summer (DST): UTC+2 (CEST)

Urrea de Gaén is a municipality located in the province of Teruel, community of Aragon, Spain. According to the 2004 census (INE), the municipality has a population of 568 inhabitants.

Located in the Lower Martin river area, in the Ebro basin, at the left bank of the Martin river, at 308 meters of elevation. It lies 160 km away from Teruel, the province capital, and 75 km away from Zaragoza, capital of the community.

== History ==
Urrea de Gaén has known human settlement at least since the Chalcolithic period (2100 BC), as evidenced by ruins and remains discovered in numerous excavations. It was inhabited by tribes of Iberian sedentanos. Later there was the Roman occupation with a wide network of agricultural settlements (fundus) in the form of villas.

A long Muslim occupation and residence (from the eighth century to 1610) left its mark in the local architecture in the Moorish styling of the village. The area was occupied by the Aragonese from the twelfth century, at the time of Ramon Berenguer IV and Petronila, becoming part of the Aragon defensive system. After multiple marriages, lawsuits and swaps, in 1268 King James I created the Lordship of Híjar for his natural son Pedro Fernandez de Hijar. Thereafter the town was always under the dominicatura of Híjar's house, until the abolition of the old regime, well into the nineteenth century.

== Monuments ==
The village is rich in architecture, history and art. Some of the more notable structures are:

- Iglesia de San Pedro Martir from the eighteenth century. Built in the baroque-style neoclassic of stone and brick. By the architect Agustín Sanz in 1782. It had a Bayeu Ramon altarpiece, a painting of St. Augustine of Jose Castillo, and another painting by Francisco de Goya, "Apparitions of the Virgin to Santiago", all missing today. The main altarpiece is the work of painter Alejandro Cañada, and there is a reproduction of Goya's painting on the altar of the Virgen del Pilar.
- The Town Hall Facade of the same period, in civil baroque style, built with brick. The bottom four arches, two of them below street level give way to the old Moorish and Jewish quarter (La Muela) and the New District.

== See also ==
- List of municipalities in Teruel
