= La Puebla de Híjar =

- Flag Coat of arms

- Location within Spain
- Coordinates: 41°13′N 0°26′W
- Country: Spain
- Autonomous community: Aragon
- Province: Teruel
- Comarca: Bajo Martín

Area
  - Total: 60.78 km^{2} (23.47 sq mi)
- Elevation: 216 m (709 ft)

Population (2025-01-01)
  - Total: 935
- Time zone: UTC+1 (CET)
  - Summer (DST): UTC+2 (CEST)

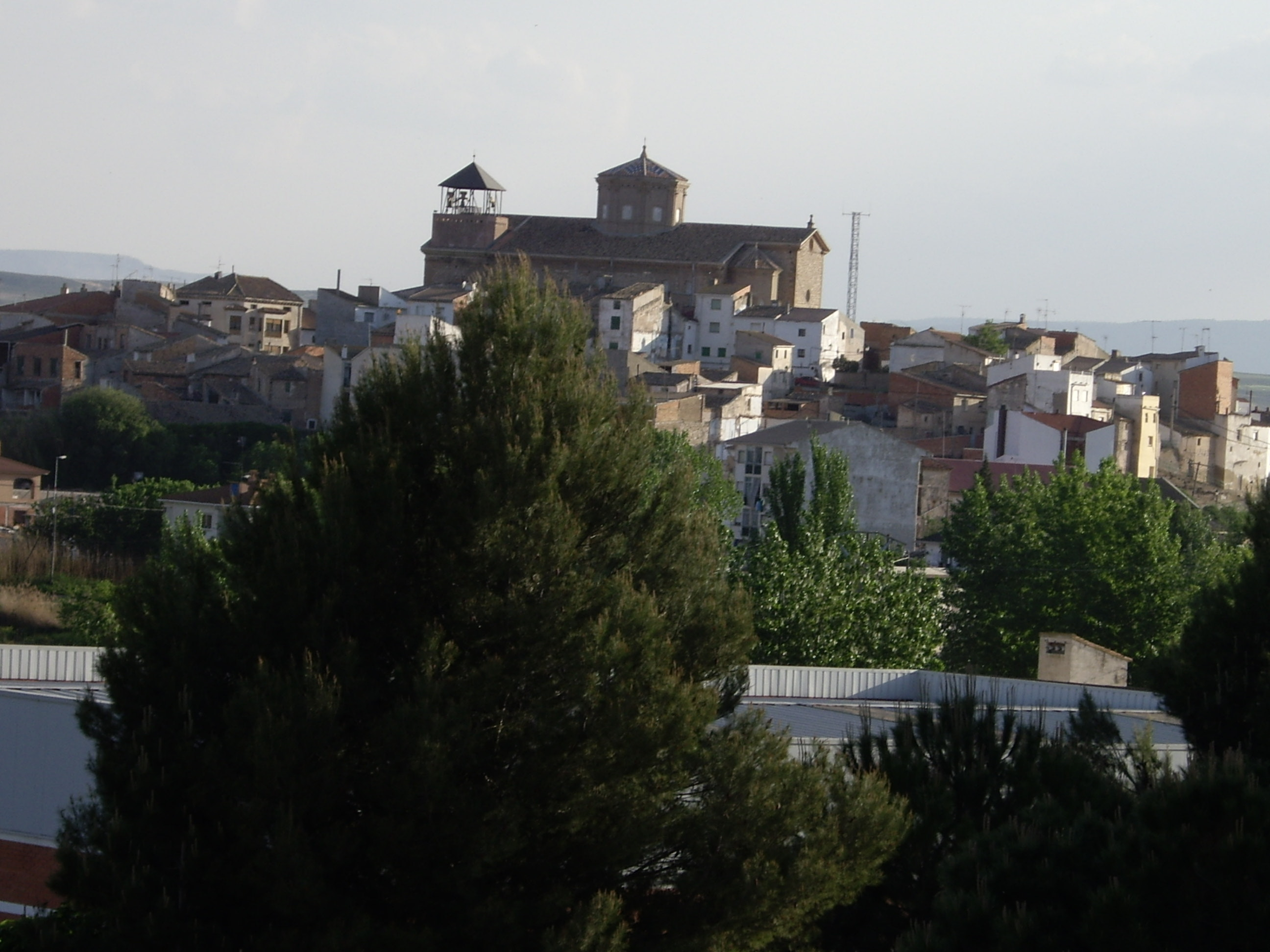
La Puebla de Híjar

La Puebla de Híjar is a town and municipality in the Bajo Martín comarca, Teruel province, Aragón, Spain. It has a population of 1,046, an area of 61 km² and is located near N-232 road.

This town was the starting point of an abandoned railway line known as "Ferrocarril del Val de Zafán", to Alcañiz, Tortosa and eventually Sant Carles de la Ràpita. Construction work began in 1891, but the last stretch between Tortosa and Sant Carles de la Ràpita was never completed before the line was abandoned.

== Politics ==
The mayor of La Puebla de Híjar is Ms. Juana María Barreras, of the Partido Socialista Obrero Español.

The Partido Socialista Obrero Español has 5 councillors in the town's ayuntamiento, Izquierda Unida has 2, and the Partido Popular has 2.

In the 2004 Spanish General Election the Partido Socialista Obrero Español got 46.0% of the vote in La Puebla de Híjar, the Partido Popular got 31.1%, Izquierda Unida got 12.5%, the Chunta Aragonesista, 6.9% and the Partido Aragonés, 2.7%.

== See also ==
- List of municipalities in Teruel
