= Ilici =

Ilici may refer to

- Ilici, a Roman town corresponding to the archaeological site of La Alcudia near Elche, Spain
- Ilići, a neighborhood of Mostar, Bosnia
