= Ius Italicum =

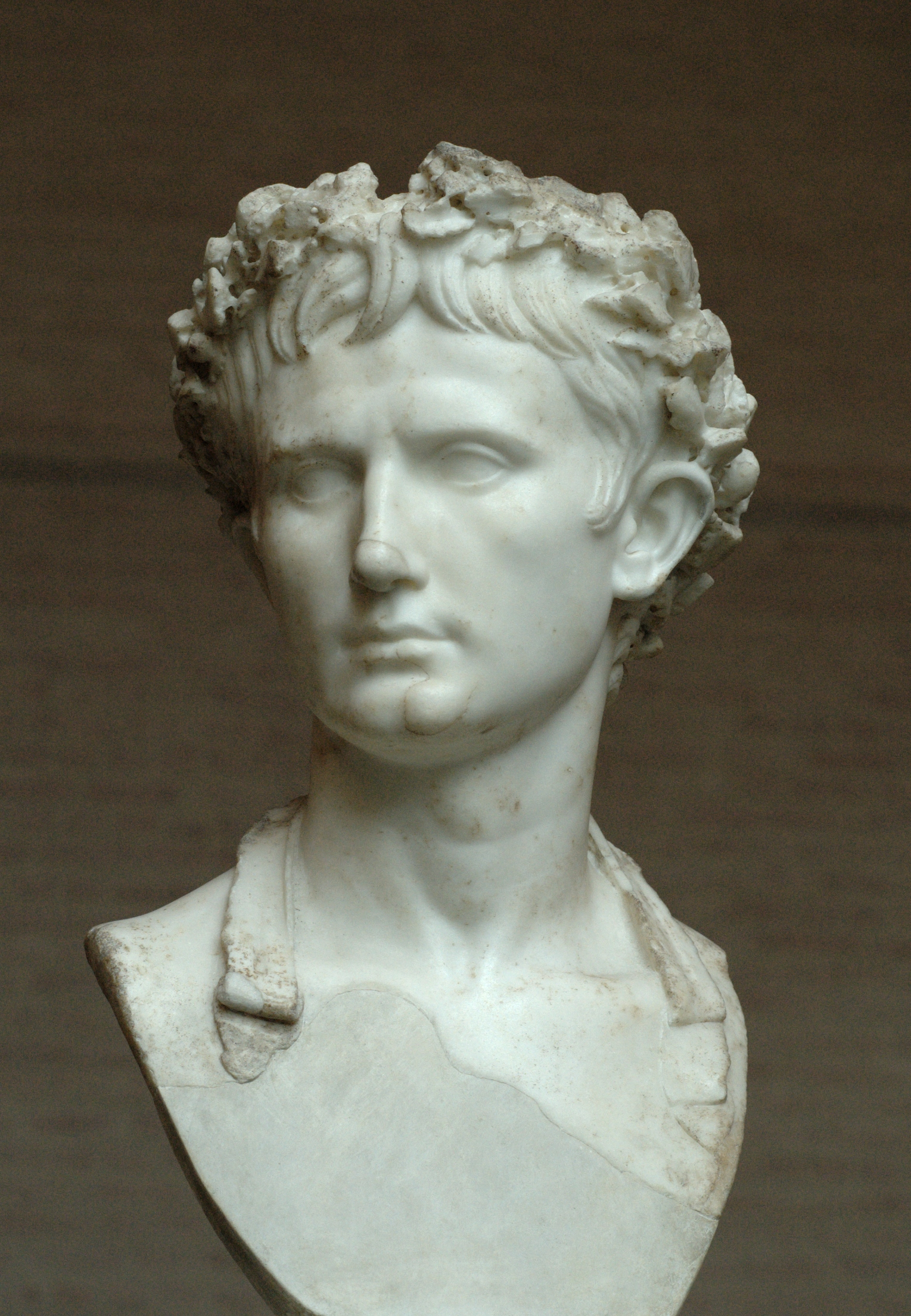
Marble bust of Augustus, the first Roman emperor to heavily use the Ius Italicum.

Ius Italicum or ius italicum (Latin, Italian or Italic law) was a law in the early Roman Empire that allowed the emperors to grant cities outside Italy the legal fiction that they were on Italian soil. This meant that the city would be governed under Roman law rather than local law, and it would have a greater degree of autonomy in their relations with provincial governors. As Roman citizens, people were able to buy and sell property, were exempt from land tax and the poll tax, and were entitled to protection under Roman law. Ius Italicum was the highest liberty a municipality or province could obtain and was considered very favorable. Emperors, such as Augustus and Septimius Severus, made use of the law during their reign.

== Augustus' enactment of the law ==
Emperor Augustus was one of the first Emperors to implement the law of Ius Italicum during his reign. During Emperor Augustus' reign he gave land-grants to veterans who participated in civil wars to reward them for their efforts. The early Roman Empire saw the creation of colonies; settlers in Roman citizen colonies (colonia civium Romanorum) had the same rights and legal privileges as cives. Military Roman colonies founded by Augustus, the first Roman emperor, were to house the civil war veterans while overseas civilian colonies were settled by Roman civilians who were deprived of their property by returning soldiers. Ancient literary sources enumerate some of the cities that were granted the privilege of Ius Italicum. The Digest, a book compiled of published Ancient Roman laws, lists the Roman colonies, that were granted the privilege of Ius Italicum.

This list comprises 16 colonies founded by Augustus Caesar: Berytus, Apamea, Sinope, Philippi, Alexandria Troas, Dyrrhacium, Pax Julia, Emerita, Valentia, Ilici, Lugdunum, Vienna, Cassandrea, Dium, Parium, Antioch of Pisidia. Augustus also enacted the law of Ius Italicum on the following cities in order to house his military legion: Arausio, Baeterrae, Barcino, Caesaraugusta, Cartenna, Corduba, Forum Julii, Gunugu, Narbo, Patrae, Rusazu, Rusguinae, Saldae, Thermae Himeraeae, Thuburbo Minus, Thuburnica, Tubusuctu and Uthina. Providing land for veterans was a high priority to Augustus and is reflected by the number of colonies that received Ius Italicum. This act was done sparingly as it was economically costly for the Roman Empire because the empire could not receive taxes from cities under this law.

== Later emperors' enactment of the Law ==
Septimius Severus, an emperor of African origin, granted Ius Italicum to several Roman municipalities in Africa including his own. The effects of this were that their land, although outside the physical boundaries of Rome, would fall under Roman law. The colony of Carthage was founded by Caesar, re-founded by Augustus, and given Ius Italicum by Septimius Severus. After a civil war in which Greece cooperated with Severus he then granted several more cities this honour as a reward.

According to the Digest, under Claudius's rule the Flavians, Trajan, and Ara Agrippinensium and three other colonies are known to have been founded and received Ius Italicum. In his Natural History (3.25), Pliny adds Acci and Libisosa to the list of Augustan cities possessing Ius Italicum. Later, Trajan founded two colonies on the Danube, one of which, Colonia Ulpia Traiana Augusta Dacica Sarmizegetusa, also received this honour.
