= Medieval Festival of Elx =

The Medieval Festival of Elx (Valencian: Festival Medieval d’Elx, IPA: [festiˈval meðieˈval ˈðɛʎtʃ]) is a feast held annually in the city of Elche, province of Alicante, Spain, between October and November.

Among the activities undertaken are medieval music concerts, plays, performances, jugglers from different backgrounds, shows about Don Quixote and Tirant lo Blanch, Druid magic show, jugglers, parades, medieval markets, cinema and workshops. In 2010, the festival celebrated its 20th edition.
