= Palmeral of Elche =

System of orchards in Elche, Spain

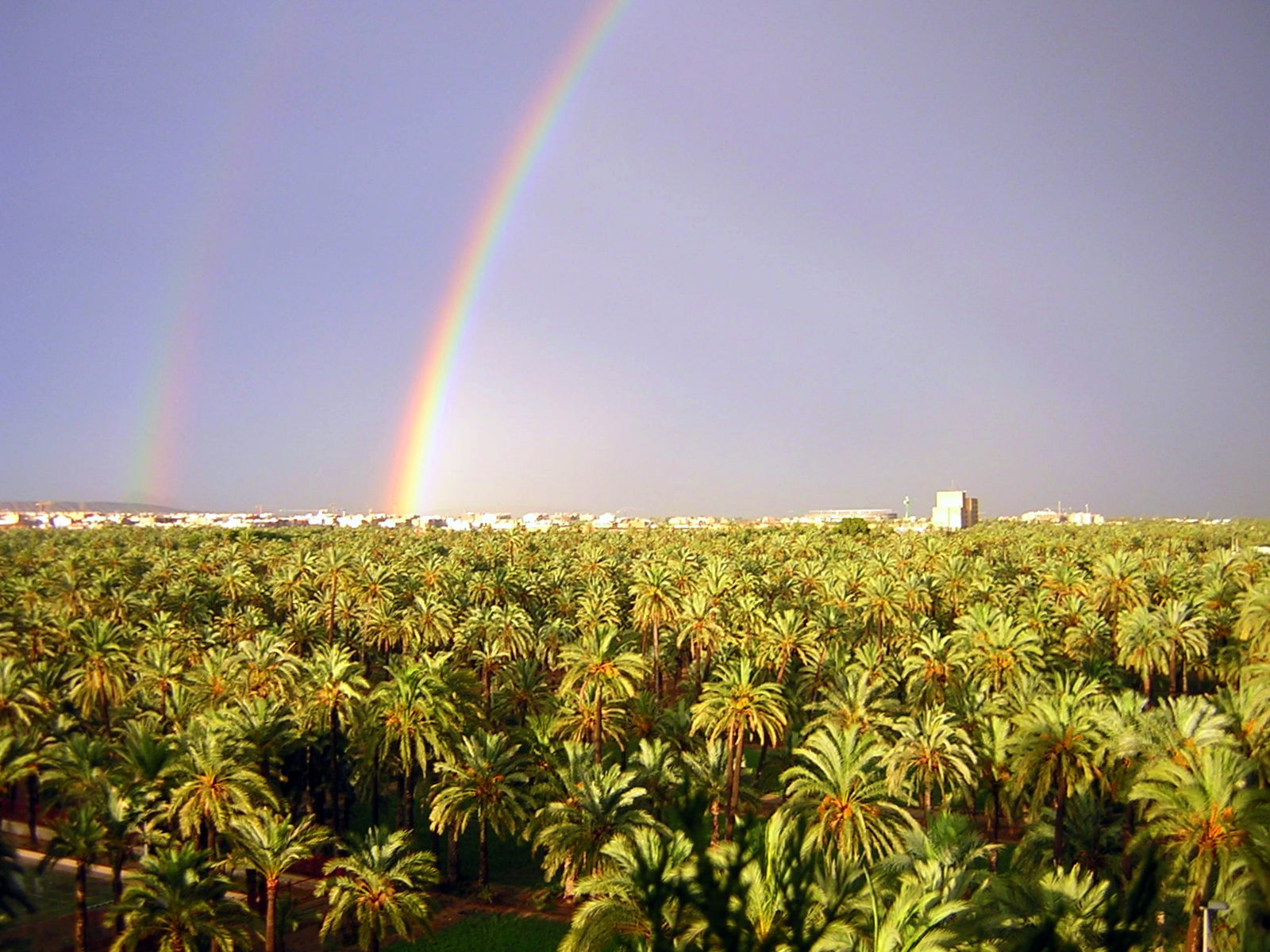
- Interactive map of Palmeral of Elche
- Location: Elche (Alicante), Spain
- Coordinates: 38°16′12″N 0°41′53″W

UNESCO World Heritage Site
- Criteria: Cultural: (ii), (v)
- Designated: 2000 (24th session)
- Reference no.: 930
- Region: Europe and North America
- Area: 144 hectares (360 acres)

Spanish Cultural Heritage
- Type: Non-movable
- Criteria: Historic Garden
- Designated: 27 July 1943
- Reference no.: RI-52-0000020

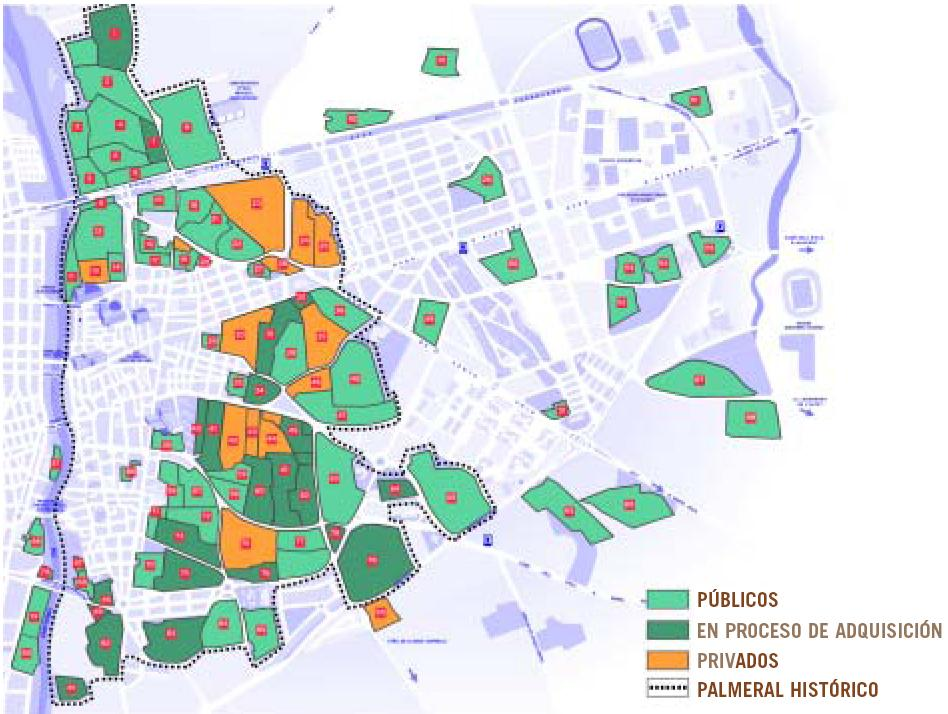
The orchards within the dotted line are the ones protected by the World Heritage Site declaration. Orchards in green are public, those in yellow, private. The Vinalopó stream marks the left limit of the site.

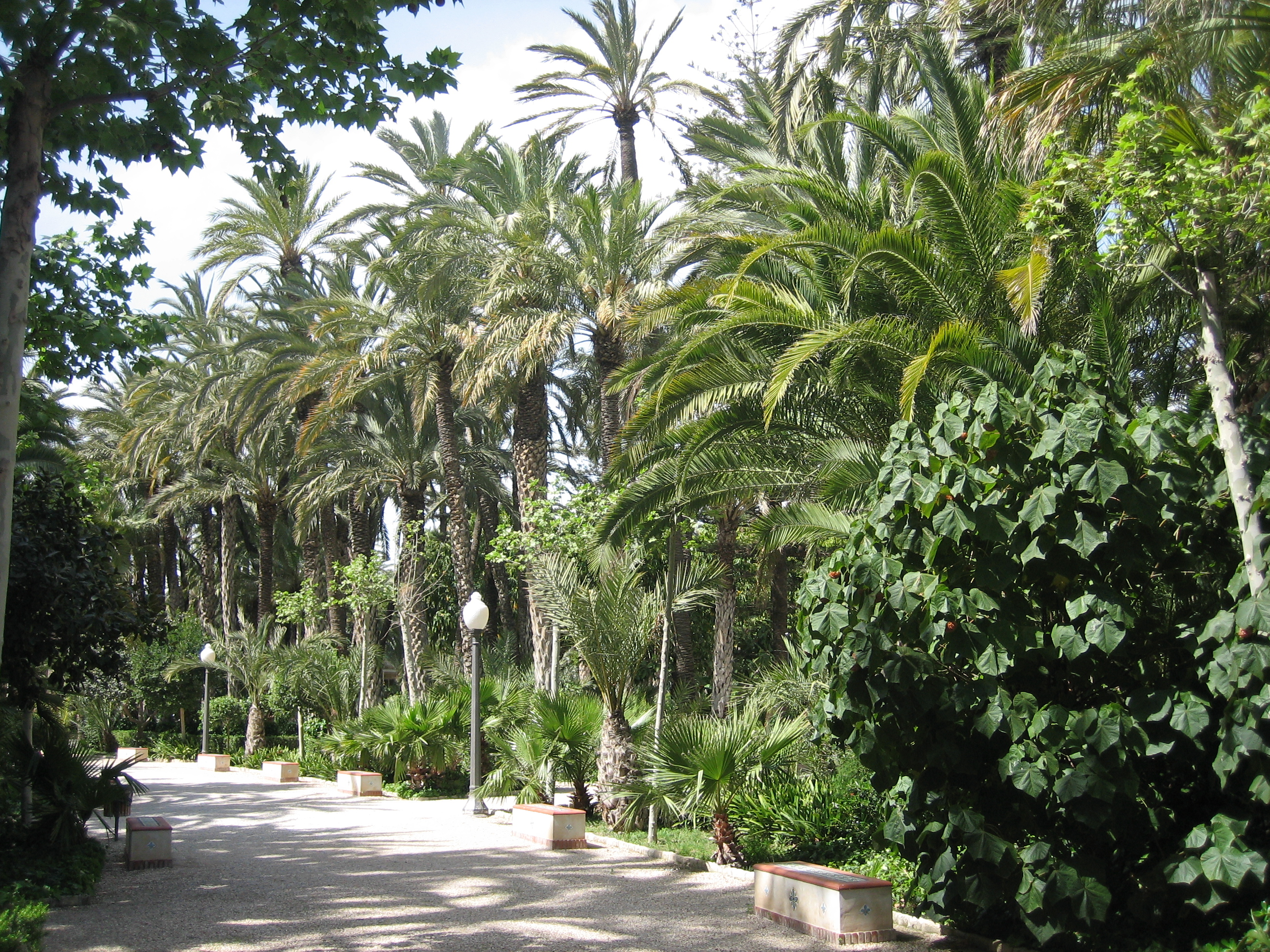
View of the palm trees in the Parque Municipal.

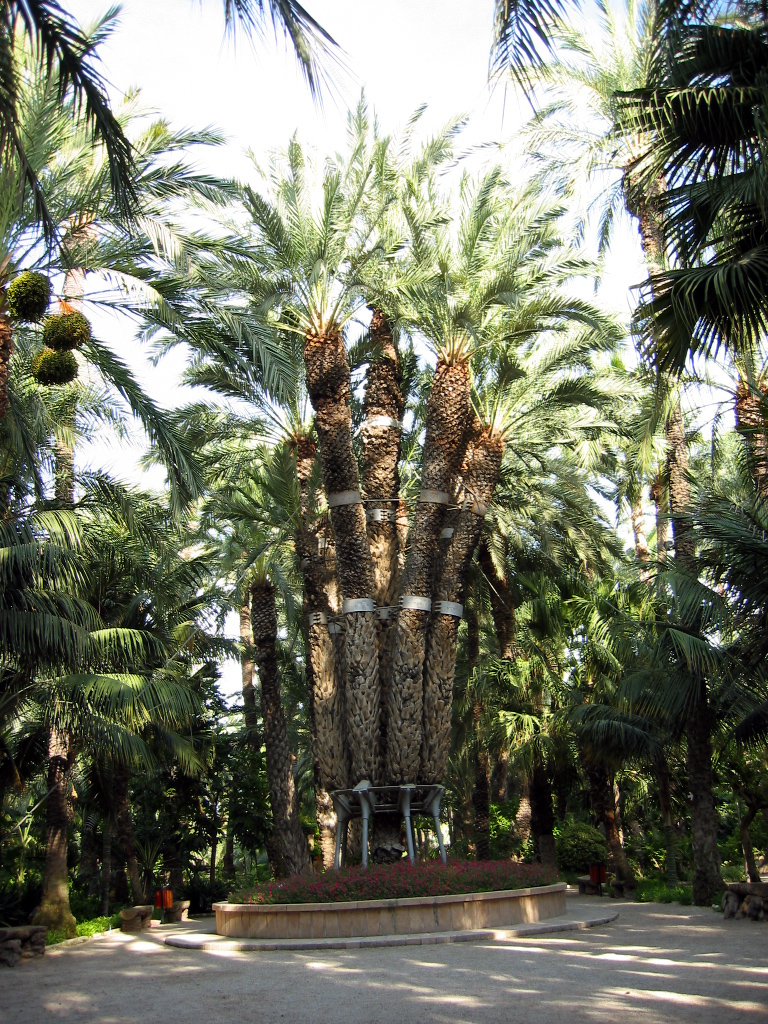
The "Imperial Palm" (Palmera Imperial) in the Hort del Cura.

The Palmeral or Palm Grove of Elche (Spanish: Palmeral de Elche; Valencian: Palmerar d'Elx) is the generic name for a system of date palm orchards in the city of Elche, Spain.

The Palmeral was planted in Roman times and underwent modifications in the medieval period under Islamic and Christian rulers. The Roman empire introduced water management techniques to Elche, but the 10th c. Islamic Caliphate of Córdoba and later rulers of Al-Andalus planted palm groves and garden-estates in huertos (rectangular base agricultural units). Islamic rulers also constructed the largest canal system sections in Elche. In the 13th century Christian rulers conquered Elche and expanded the canal system. Industrialization and urban sprawl contracted the Palmeral in the late 19th and 20th century. The Spanish national government and Valencian regional government enacted legislation to protect the Palm Grove. In 2000, UNESCO designated the Palmeral a World Heritage Site, but climate change, pests, and disease threaten the site. The Palmeral includes a National Artistic Garden, Palm Grove Museum, Route of El Palmeral, and Municipal Park.

== History ==
=== Roman Empire ===
In the 5th century BCE, Carthaginian settlers in the town of Ilici planted the first date palms of Elche. After Rome’s conquest of the Iberian peninsula in the 2nd century BCE, Roman settlers introduced the first elaborate forms of agricultural water management. To irrigate their cereal and olive tree crop fields, the Romans constructed a dam at the Vinalopó River bed in the mountains north of Elche. Aqueducts then channeled the dam water to Elche.

=== Córdoba Caliphate and Al-Andalus ===
==== Environmental engineering ====
In the 10th century CE, the Caliphate of Córdoba moved the city of Elche seven km away from Ilici to its present location. The Caliphate from the 7th to 10th century expanded the irrigation system into a complicated canal system centered on the Vinalopó river. The rulers applied North African water management techniques to create an oasis in an arid environment. Faced with scarce rainfall, irregular river flow, and brackish water from the Vinalopó river, the Caliphate in the second half of the tenth century planted palm groves. The palm trees prevented soil erosion, decreased water evaporation, provided shade, and protected crops from wind. The Caliphate divided the groves into huertos (rectangular base agricultural unit, Spanish for orchard) forming huertas (groups of huertos). Palm trees were planted in a grid pattern with single or double rows along the rectangular huerto edges. The palm trees enhanced agricultural production in an arid region with summer temperatures consistently above 30 °C and annual rainfall below 250 mm (9.8 in). Forage plants, cereals (i.e., corn, wheat, barley, alfalfa), and medium-sized trees (i.e., pomegranates) were planted inside the huerto for human and livestock consumption. The palm groves also provided construction material for wood, fibers (i.e., baskets, thatched house roofing), and ornamentation. Huertas were bounded by cascabots (fences of plaited dried palm leaves) or 1–2 m high plastered walls of undressed stone. In addition to agriculture, tenants planted elaborate gardens.

Elche residents prized gardens and orchards as respites from the arid conditions, offering an oasis of scents, sounds, touch, and visual beauty. In the Islamic period, gardens symbolized paradise. A strong literary tradition presented gardens as metaphors for love, loss, memory and the passing of time. The “desert castles” garden-estate concept first entered the Iberian peninsula in the 8th century CE when Umayyad amīr Abd al-Rahman I fled from Syria to Córdoba, Spain. Under the Caliphate of Córdoba, the garden-estate tradition percolated into Toledo, Seville, Granada, and Elche. After the fall of the Umayyad dynasty, later rulers of Al-Andalus continued the garden-estate tradition. Elche residents planted linear walled gardens in which water channels established symmetrical plots, irrigating rectangular landscapes of fruit trees, flowers, vegetation, and often walkways flanked the sides.

==== Canal system ====
The Caliphate of Córdoba constructed a comprehensive canal system for urban consumption, industrial production, and crop irrigation. Islamic rulers regarded water as a social good and designed the canal system to maximize water conservation. With over 20 branches, the main canal Acequia Mayor channeled the brackish water from the Vinalopó River through secondary channels and partidores to crop fields. Upon reaching partidores north of Elche, the water flow split into the partidor de Albinella and the partidor de Marchena. The partidor de Albinella diverted water into Elche for urban consumption and industrial production. The partidor supplied small industries (i.e., oil and soap producers), bathhouses, and local markets. The partidor de Marchena within the Acequia Marchena channeled water to the right side of the Vinalopó River. The Acequia Mayor on the left side of the Vinalopó River stretched south across Elche to the crop fields. Elche residents cultivated crop fields for human and livestock consumption as well as sale in local markets. The Acequia Mayor ended at a partidor channeling excess flow into two reservoirs. The canal system was maintained under Islamic rule until the Christian Reconquista.

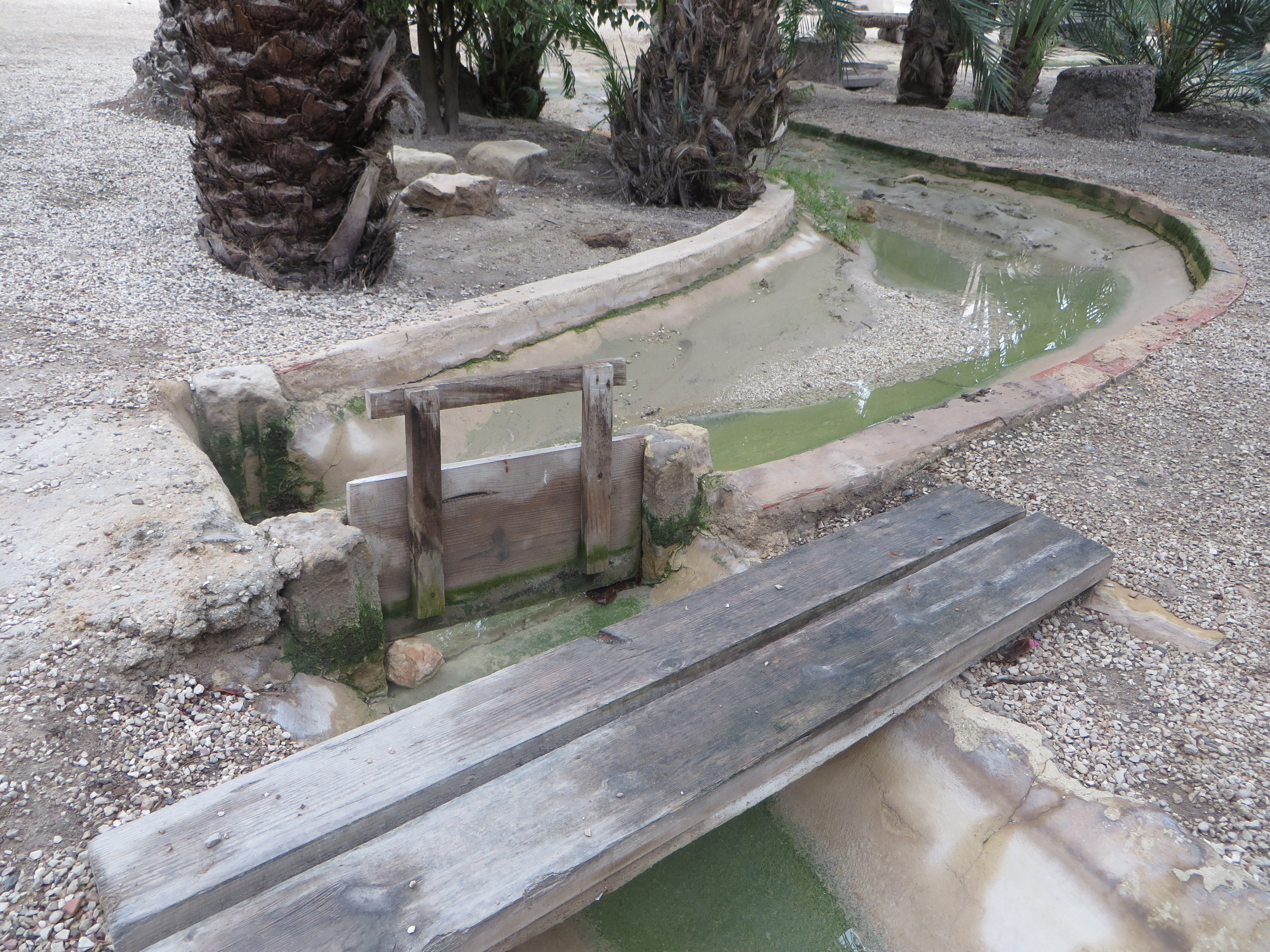
Partidore from the Elche canal system

=== Christian kingdoms ===
==== Redistribution of the canal system ====
In the 13th century, Christian rulers conquered the city of Elche from Al-Andalus. The Christian rulers claimed the canal network and redistributed its sections between Elche’s Christian and Muslim residents. All lands left of the river, called the Huerta Major or Huerta de los Cristianos, belonged to the Christian tenants. The Christian canal system contained nine irrigation parts from the Acequia Mayor. All lands right of the Vinalopó River, known as the Huerta de los Moros, belonged to the Muslim occupants. The partidores, constructed from wood and stone, were redeployed within different irrigation system sections. After redistributing water rights, the Christian rulers expanded the canal system. In the main canal, partidores shifted the current flow to secondary canals. The secondary canals channeled one water part to the Albinella for Elche urban consumption, two parts for the Séquia de Marchena and 25 parts for the Acequia Mayor. In the 14th century, the Christian tenants constructed water mills on the main canal for flour production. The water mills disappeared in the 20th century due to the introduction of electricity to Elche. The Christian residents also introduced palm weaving. The locals wove desiccated “white palms” for decorative and processional use on Palm Sunday. The palm weaving tradition and Palm Sunday parade continues in Elche today.

==== Canal system expansions ====
In the 16th century, rapid population expansion paired with Elche’s arid environment prompted canal expansion. In 1529, Elche officials constructed the Contraséquia section to prevent Vinalopó river flooding and irrigate crop fields with the excess flow. The canal extension distributed water to a reservoir north of the town then south to the Séquia Major for crop irrigation. From 1632 to 1646, Elche residents built a dam to reinforce the Contraséquia. The dam stored and channeled any excess drainage from the nearby Tarafa stream into the canal network. Frequent reservoir clogging and elevated salinity levels from evaporation limited the dam’s impact. As the canal network expanded, so too did the need for water administration. The Libro Major and Libro Chico water books recorded rights and dates for water distribution in tanda (irrigation round) or 37.5 day sessions. Every landowner received water at a specified time and water part. The irrigation system distributed water in a two-ring system composed of huerto water and dula water. The first ring contained huerto water for urban consumption and palm groves within Elche. The second ring comprised dula water for crop irrigation outside Elche city limits. Greater irrigation distance resulted in stricter standards for dula water. The tandas and ring system lost function in the 20th century. As Elche industrialized in the late 19th and 20th century, the canal system and palm grove production declined.

==== Industrialization ====
Urban sprawl on the eastern part of the city encroach on the palm groves today. Beginning in 1884, railways sectioned off huertas from uninterrupted fields into isolated plots. In the 20th century, industrialization and urban sprawl led to the abandonment of many huertas. Industrialization supplanted agricultural production economically, reducing palm groves to a cultural and landscape role. By the second half of the 20th century, date harvesting (which still occurs between November and December) and "white palm" production became heritage activities reserved for the local marketplace. Limited land availability for the expanding footwear industry and a rising urban population resulted in the government seizing many huertas. Housing, social infrastructure, and parks were erected atop former huertas. As industrialization reduced palm production to a minor economic role, the Palmeral contracted in size. Legislative action by the Spanish national government and Valencian regional government preserved the site.

== Protections and threats ==
=== 20th-century protections ===
Efforts to protect the palm groves predate the 2000 UNESCO World Heritage designation. As the Palmeral faded in economic importance, tenants abandoned huertas. The Spanish government first passed protective legislation in the 1930s. The Ministry of Agriculture in the Republic of Spain barred logging operations and palm-endangering activities on March 8, 1933. The Ministry of National Education invoked the Artistic Treasury Law on July 27, 1943 and designated all Elche palm groves an Artistic Garden. The Valencian General Urban Development Plan of 1962 permitted detached houses in huertos for education, hospitality, or parks. To bypass legislation, residents replanted the palm trees within the huerto, thereby breaking up the original palm grove alignment. In the 1970s, the Valencian government reclassified some palm groves as social huertos to address the growing need for social infrastructure. The reclassification allowed the construction of artistic gardens, schools, hotels, houses as well as health, sport, and religious facilities on specified palm groves. Early legislation did not halt Palmeral contraction.

In response, the Valencian regional government passed stricter legislation. The Regional Government of Valencia passed the Law of the Tutelage and Protection of the Palmeral of Elche in 1986, thereby replacing all previous regulations. The Valencian government formed a board of trustees, called the Patronato del Palmeral, to protect and promote the palm groves within and outside the Elche city limits. The Patronato del Palmeral closed legal loopholes and regulated their operations, including the cutting of white palms for Palm Sunday. To protect the palm groves for historical and cultural heritage, the 1998 General Urban Development Plan converted private huertas into public spaces. The plan added urban historical gardens to the palm grove protections and barred any intervention without approval from the Patronato del Palmeral. The legislation proved effective until the UNESCO World Heritage Site designation in 2000.

=== 21st-century protections ===
In December 2000 at the XXIV meeting of the World Heritage Committee, UNESCO (United Nations Educational, Scientific, and Cultural Organization) successfully established the Palm Grove and El Misteri d'Elx (The Mystery of Elche) as a World Heritage Site. The UN organization cited two of the six protection requirements, particularly Criteria II and Criteria V. Under Criteria II, the Palmeral of Elche represented cultural expansion and cohesion through landscape transference practices from North Africa to Europe. The Palm Grove of Elche remains a ritualized and romanticized site, including the palm weaving for processional use. Under Criteria V, the heterogeneous (i.e., Roman, Islamic, and Christian) irrigation system constituted cultural significance. In addition to UNESCO, Spain partnered with France in the Phoenix Station (Estación Phoenix) to protect the Palmeral. The partnership includes the Spanish Municipality of Elche, Government of Valencia, and the Universities of Elche and Alicante as well as the French National Institute of Agronomic Research and the Centre of International Co-operation of Agronomic Research for Development.

Protections are currently under revision from the Elche City Council and UNESCO. The Elche City Council is reviewing another special plan, allowing for temporary constructions (i.e., tents) for municipal gardens and tourism, including nature classrooms, garden sales, and palm workshops. The plan may affect 67 orchards (1.5 million m^{2} out of the total 2.4 million m^{2} ) within the World Heritage site. UNESCO is currently discussing protection changes to grant a broader use of the palm trees opposed to just their leaves. Despite UNESCO protections, the Palm Grove remains under threat from forces beyond industrialization.

=== Threats ===
Climate change, pests, and diseases threaten the Palmeral. Inadequate sun, humidity, and wider temperature ranges from climate change curb the palm tree growth season. The red palm weevil (Rhynchophorus ferrugineus) pest has infested several huertas, laying its eggs inside the palm tree stems. The scale insect Red Date Scale (Phoenicococcus marlatti) lays eggs on the trunk and stems, resulting in an invasive fungus. To combat the red palm weevil and Red Date Scale, Palmeral management deploys biological pest control, pheromone traps, and approved specific pesticides. Within the Phoenix Station, the French National Institute of Agronomic Research and the Centre of International Co-operation of Agronomic Research for Development performs biological research to increase palm tree climate, pests, and disease resistance. Palmeral management also has deployed red date scale predators Rhyzobius lophantae and Chilocorus bipustulatus.

== 21st-century Palmeral ==
Under UNESCO and Phoenix Station management, the Palmeral transitioned from a local site to a tourist destination. The Palmeral is the only palm grove in Europe with North African origins and the largest on the continent. The Palm Grove also constitutes the northernmost and one of the largest palm groves in the world. Today, the city of Elche contains 97 orchards composed of 70,000 date palms, concentrated in the east bank of the Vinalopó. Outside the Elche city domain, other large plantations contain approximately 130,000 date palms. In total, Elche and its vicinity hold 200,000 palms. The Palm Grove ranges over 3.5 km^{2} (1.4 sq mi), including 1.5 km^{2} (0.58 sq mi) within the city of Elche. The Palm Grove of Elche comprises the National Artistic Garden, Palm Grove Museum, Route of El Palmeral, and Municipal Park.

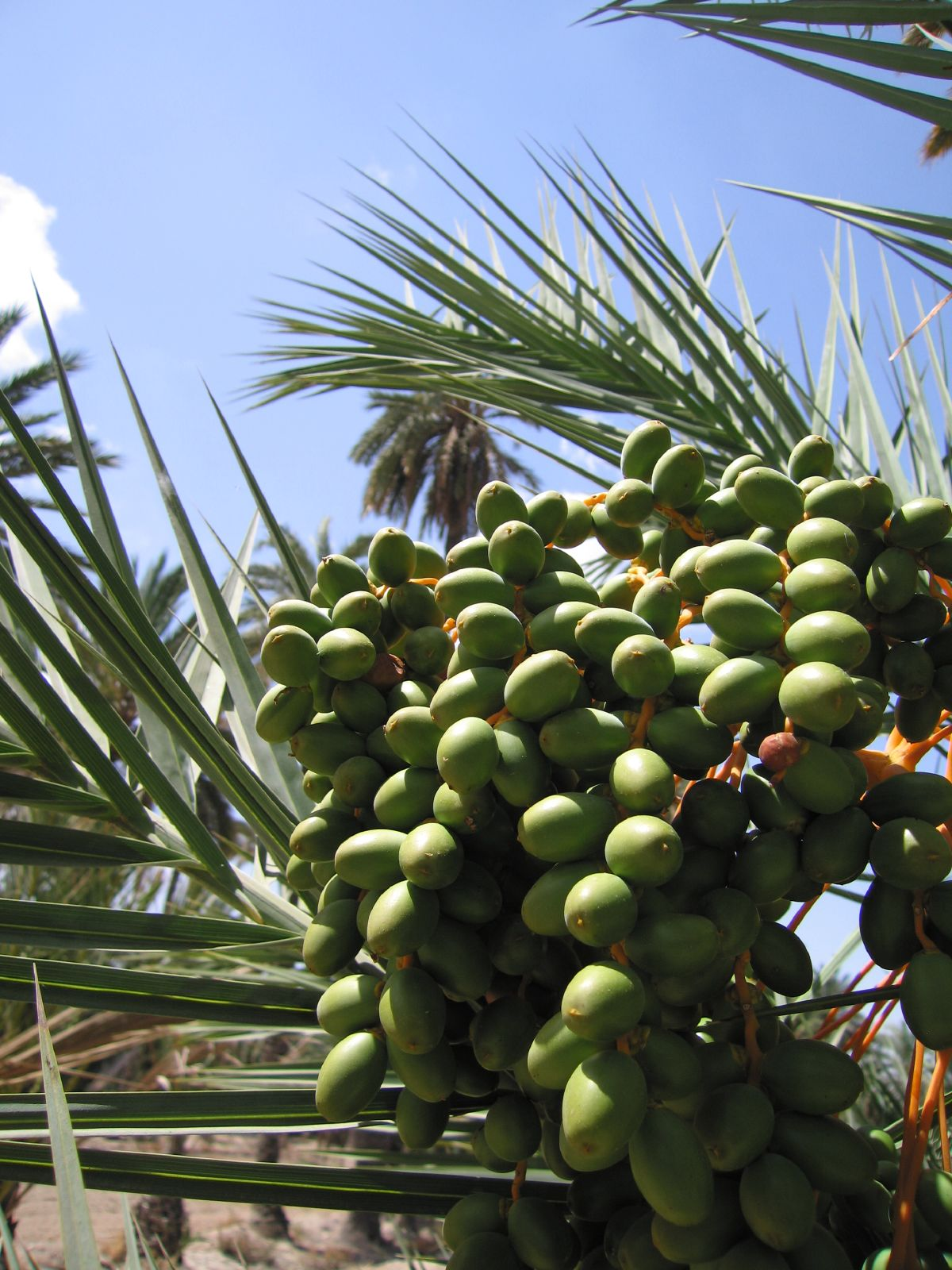
Date fruit from date palm trees within the National Artistic Garden

=== National Artistic Garden (Huerto del Cura Garden) ===
The National Artistic Garden encompasses the palm groves, the Ornamental Collections, ponds, sculptures, and the garden house. Some palm trees grow to a height of more than 30 metres and live up to 300 years. The famous "Imperial Palm" (Palmera Imperial) is a 176 year old, male date palm tree (Phoenix dactylifera) with 7 stems in the shape of a candelabra. The city Elche named the Palm after Elisabeth (Sissi), the Empress consort of Franz Joseph, who visited the plantation in 1894 by Chaplain Castaño. The Ornamental Collection contains palm trees from 70 different species, chiefly date palm trees (Phoenix dactylifera), as well as olive trees and citrus trees.

=== Palm Grove Museum (El Palmeral Museum) ===
The Palm Grove Museum, housed within two traditional 19th century houses connected by a skybridge, details the historical and cultural context of the Palm Grove and UNESCO World Heritage status. The two-story museum also provides demonstrations by Palmereros (palm workers) that plait white palms.

=== Route of El Palmeral (The Filet de Fora Palm Park) ===
The Route of El Palmeral, which starts and finishes at the Palm Grove Museum, takes visitors across the Acequia Mayor del Pantano irrigation system to the Huerto del Cura and Filet de Fora Palm Trees Park. The Filet de Flora Palm Trees Park includes the Huertos de Rogeta, Sempere, Casimira, Pastoret, Mareta, Borreguet, and Monjo palm groves.

=== Municipal Park ===
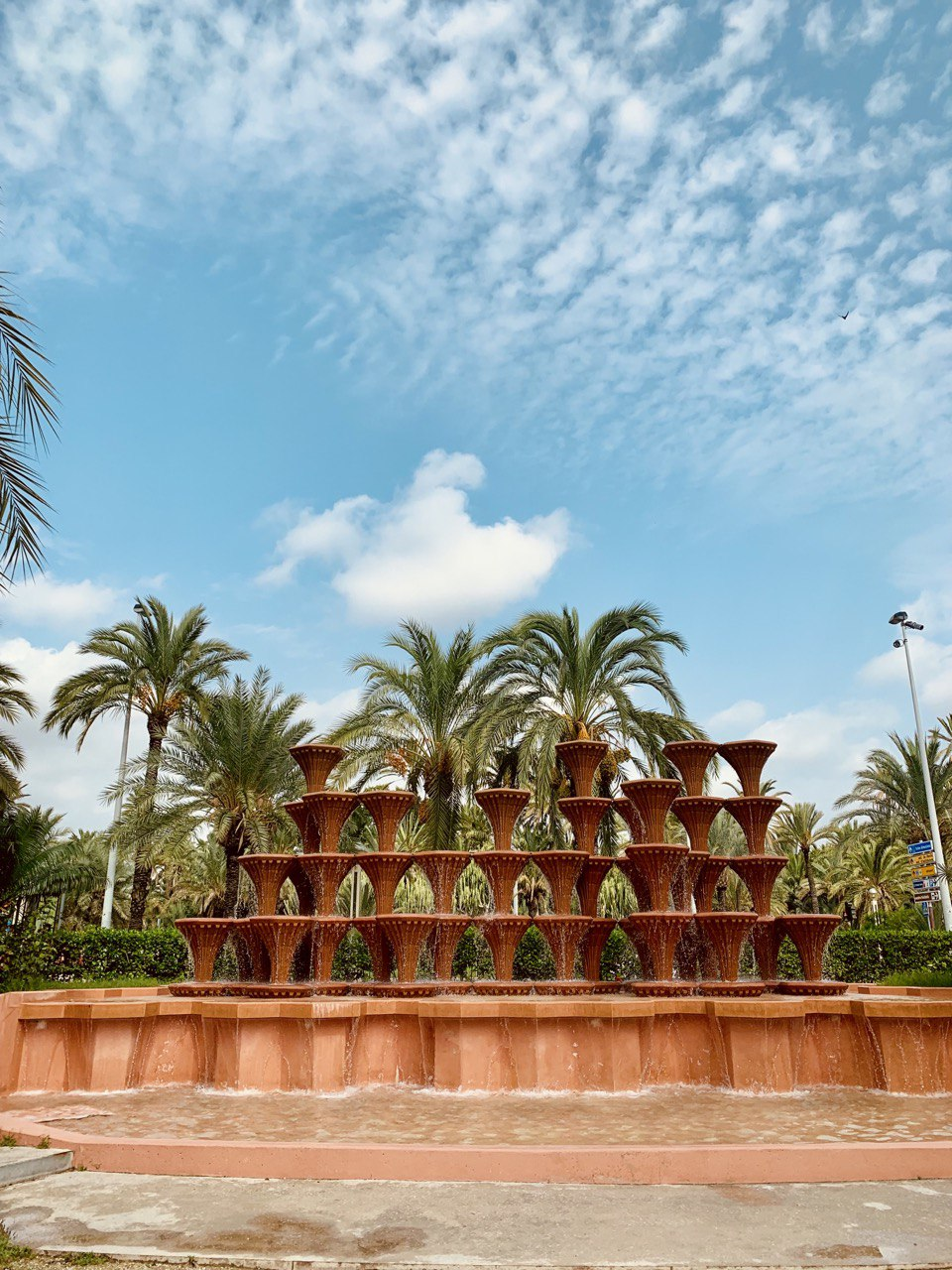
Fuente La Gloriera in Municipal Park

The Municipal Park, located in the center of Elche, comprises six hectares or 20,000 square meters. The site includes the Huertos del Colomer garden, Molí del Real water mill, and Hort de Baix outdoor amphitheater. The city council controls the conservation and maintenance of the public park outside UNESCO.

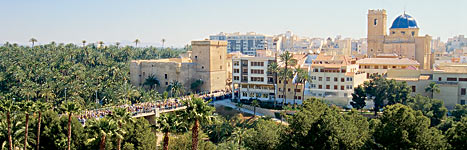
Panoramic view of Elche, showing the palm trees within the city.

== Bibliography ==
- AGASTA Julio and PINEDA Enrique, La gestión del Palmeral de Elche, BARCIELA C., LÓPEZ M.I., MELGAREJO J. (eds.), Los bienes culturales y su aportación al desarrollo sostenible, San Vicente del Raspeig, Universidad de Alicante, 2012.
- AGULLÓ Miguel, GALIANA Carlos, La palmera datilera. Cultivo y aprovechamiento, Alicante, Instituto de Estudios Alicantinos, 1983.
- AZUAR Rafael, Espacio hidráulico y ciudad islámica en el Vinalopó. La huerta de Elche, Agua y territorio. I Congreso de Estudios del Vinalopó, Petrel, Ayuntamiento de Petrel – Ayuntamiento de Villena, 1998.
- AYUNTAMIENTO DE ELCHE, Plan Especial de Protección del Palmeral. Normativa, 2013. “Bienes declarados Patrimonio Mundial. Palmeral de Elche". www.mecd.gob.es. Ministerio de Educación, Cultura y Deporte.
- Blair, Sheila., and Jonathan Bloom. “Rivers of Paradise : Water in Islamic Art and Culture / Edited by Sheila Blair and Jonathan Bloom.” New Haven: Yale University Press, 2009.
- Carmona-Zubiri, Daniel, and Antonio Miguel Nogués-Pedregal. Coping with two World Heritages. The two UNESCO declarations and local identity in Elche. In Proceedings of the 2nd International Conference on Heritage and Sustainable Development.
- CREMADES Vicente, Protección y tutela normativa de “el palmeral de Elche”, Revista de Sociales y Jurídicas, 2009.
- D. Fairchild Ruggles, Islamic gardens and landscapes, Philadelphia 2008.
- Gharipour, Mohammad. Gardens of Renaissance Europe and the Islamic Empires : Encounters and Confluences / Edited by Mohammad Gharipour. University Park, Pennsylvania: The Pennsylvania State University Press, 2017.
- GIL Antonio. El regadío de Elche. Estudios Geográficos, 1968.
- GLICK Thomas, Regadío y sociedad en la Valencia medieval, Valencia, Biblioteca Valenciana, 2003.
- GRACIA Lina, Indicadores ambientales y paisajísticos del palmeral de Elche, doctoral thesis. Elche, 2006.
- GUINOT Enric and SELMA Sergi, Las acequias de Elche y Crevillente, Valencia, Consellería d’Agricultura, Peixca i Alimentació, 2003.
- IBARRA Pedro, Estudio acerca de la institución del riego de Elche y origen de sus aguas, Madrid, Establecimiento tipográfico de Jaime Ratés, 1914.
- John Brookes, Gardens of paradise. The history and design of the great Islamic gardens, New York 1987
- LAUREANO Pietro, Atlas de agua. Los conocimientos tradicionales para combatir la desertificación, Barcelona, Ipogea, 2005.
- Michael Ferry, et al. Date Palms of Elche. The Date Palm of Elche Spain: Research for the Sustainable Preservation of A World Heritage Site. 2002. Vol 46 (3).
- Museo del Palmeral. “El Regadío.” Government of Elche. Accessed 11.14.2020. El Regadío
- National Artistic Palm Grove. “Elche’s Palm Grove.” Huerto del Cura. Accessed 11.12.2020. Elche’s Palm Grove
- National Artistic Palm Grove. “Ornamental Collections.” Huerto del Cura. Accessed 11.12.2020. https://www.huertodelcura.com/ornamental-collections
- National Artistic Palm Grove. “The Imperial Palm Tree.” Huerto del Cura. Accessed 11.14.2020. www.huertodelcura.com/the-imperial-palm-tree/
- Ortiz Mayordomo, C., and L. G. Vicente. Agrosystems protection as heritage elements: Cultural Landscapes. In Fourth International Scientific Symposium Agrosym 2013, Jahorina, Bosnia and Herzegovina, 3–6 October 2013. Book of Proceedings. Faculty of Agriculture, University of East Sarajevo, 2013.
- SAGASTA Julio and PINEDA Enrique, La gestión del Palmeral de Elche, BARCIELA C., LÓPEZ M.I., MELGAREJO J. (eds.), Los bienes culturales y su aportación al desarrollo sostenible, San Vicente del Raspeig, Universidad de Alicante, 2012.
- SEVILLA Martín, Crecimiento y urbanización. Elche 1960-1980, Valencia, Universidad de Alicante, Ayuntamiento de Elche, 1985. SANS, Francisco X., La diversidad de los agroecosistemas, Ecosistemas, 16, 2007, 1.
- Visit Elche Local Autonomous Body. “Palmeral de Elche.” Elche Tourist Office, Government of Elche. Accessed 11.14.2020. Palmeral de Elche – VisitElche
