= Elche =

Municipality in Valencian Community, Spain

Elche Elx
- City and municipality
- Elx / Elche (official)
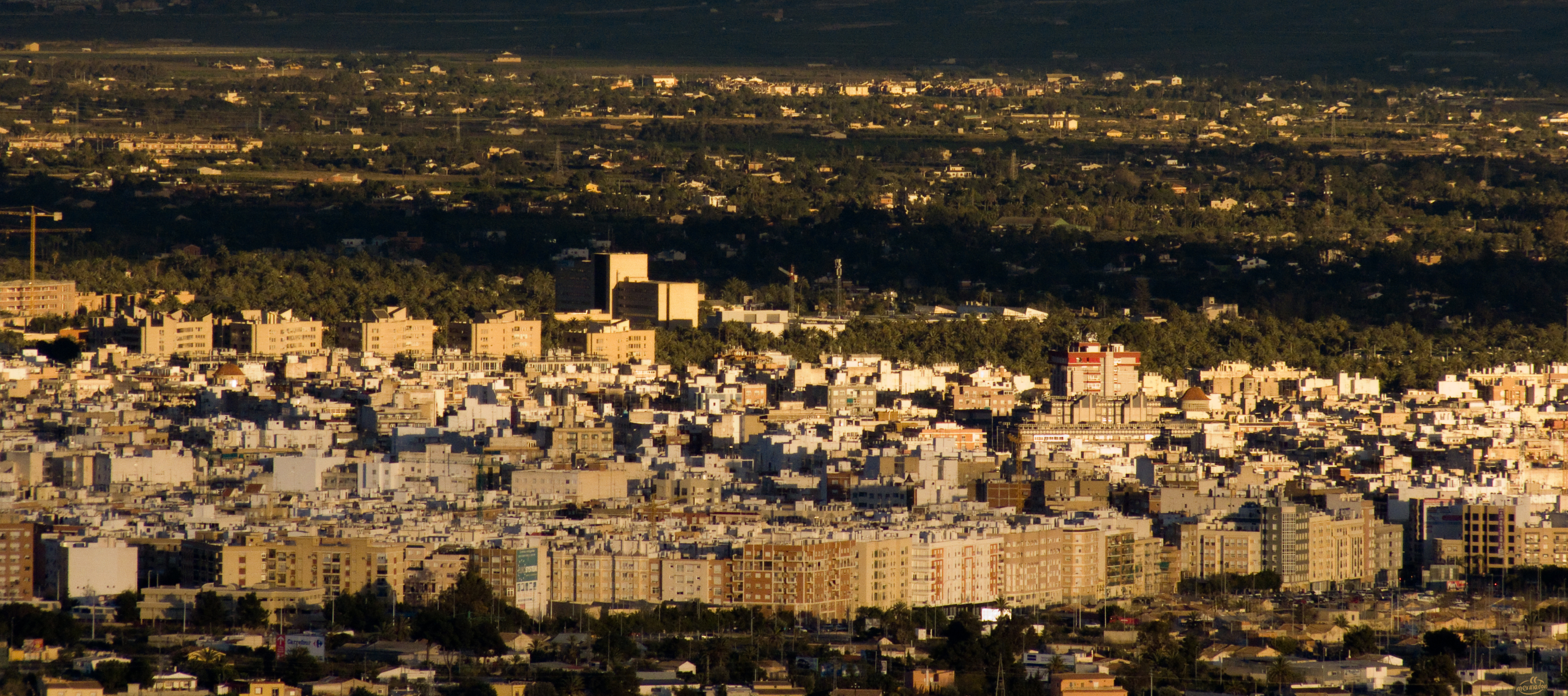
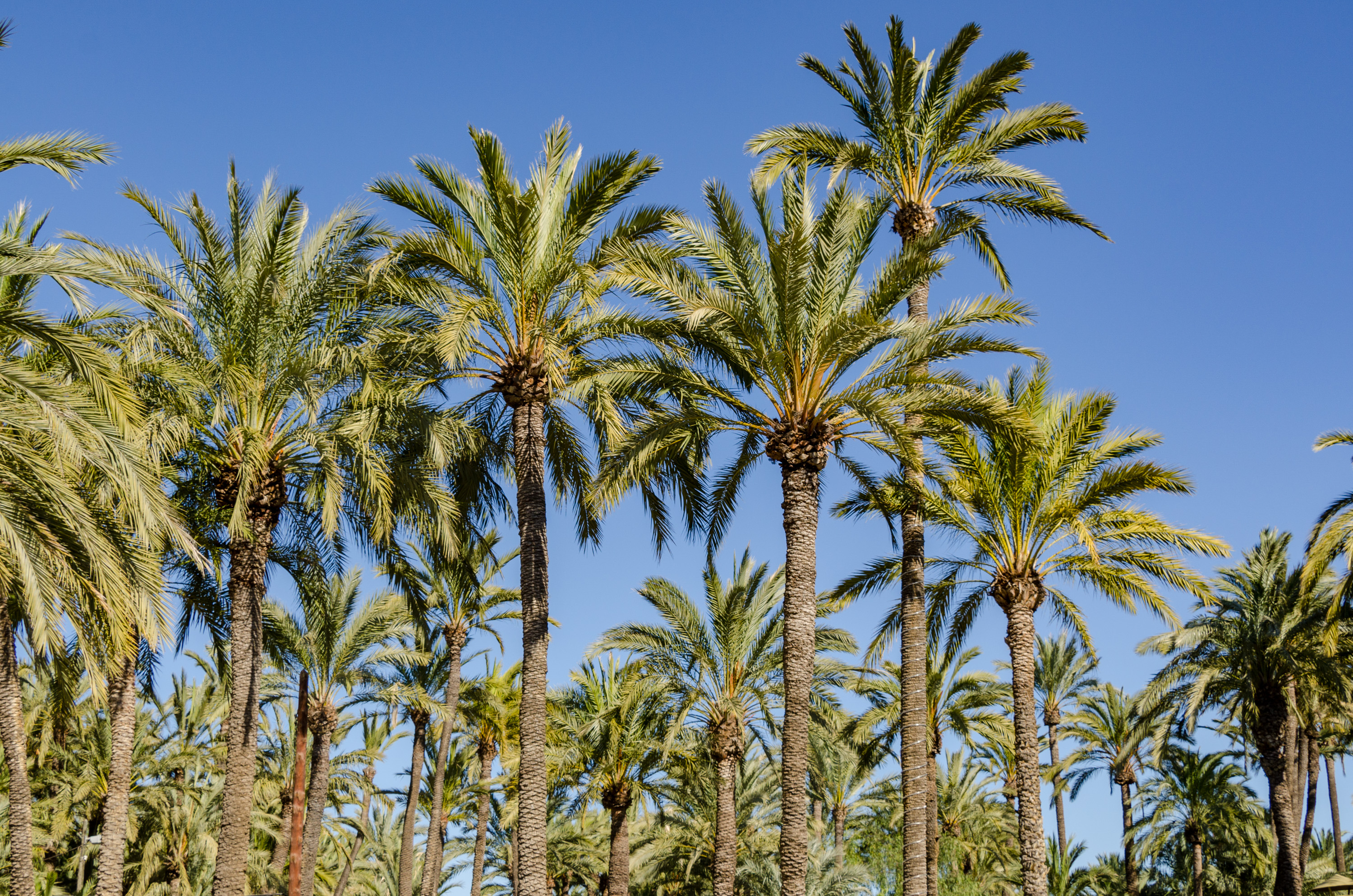
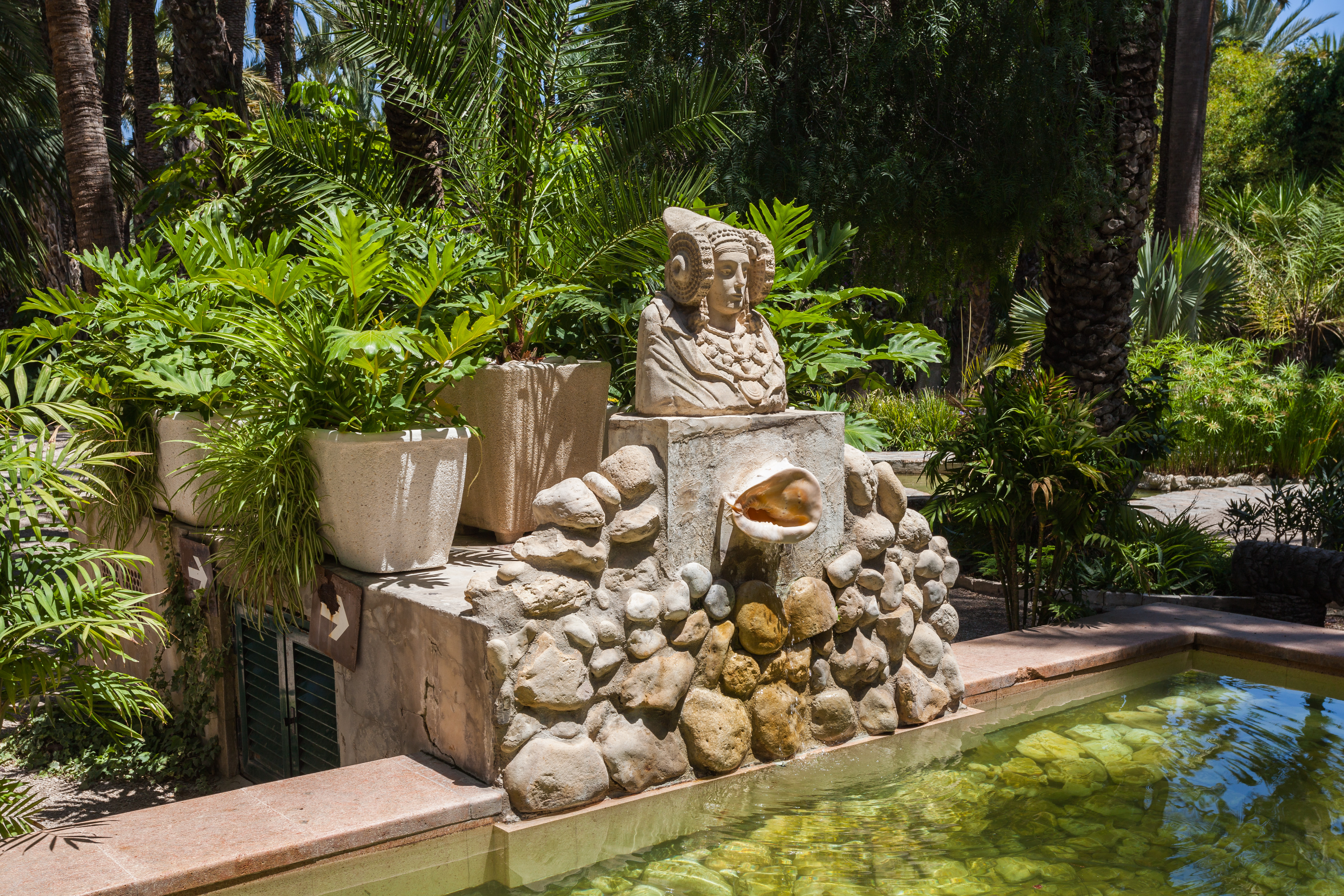
- Panoramic view Palm trees Replica of the Lady of Elche

- Flag Coat of arms
- Interactive map of Elche
- Location in the Province of Alicante Location in the Valencian Community Location in Spain
- Coordinates: 38°16′1″N 0°41′54″W
- Country: Spain
- Autonomous community: Valencian Community
- Province: Alacant / Alicante
- Comarca: Baix Vinalopó

Government
  - Mayor: Pablo Ruz Villanueva (2023) (PP)

Area
  - Total: 326.50 km^{2} (126.06 sq mi)
- Elevation: 86 m (282 ft)

Population (2024)
  - Total: 242,317
  - Density: 742.17/km^{2} (1,922.2/sq mi)
- Demonyms: • il·licità, -ana (Val.) • ilicitano/a (Sp.)
- Official language(s): Valencian; Spanish
- Linguistic area: Valencian
- Time zone: UTC+1 (CET)
  - Summer (DST): UTC+2 (CEST)
- Postal code: 03200–03299
- Dialing code: +34 96
- Website: www.elche.es

Elche, (Note: Pronunciation of Elche: English: /ˈɛltʃeɪ/; Spanish: [ˈeltʃe].) in Spanish, or Elx, (Note: Pronunciation of Elx: UK: /ɛltʃ/, US: /eɪlʃ/; Valencian: [ˈɛʎtʃ].) in Valencian (officially: Elx / Elche), is a city and municipality of Spain, belonging to the province of Alicante, in the Valencian Community. With of 242,317 inhabitants as of 2024, it is the 3rd-most populated municipality in the region. It is part of the comarca of Baix Vinalopó.

Part of the municipality is coastal yet the city proper is roughly 15 km (9 mi) away from the Mediterranean Sea. Elche is the centre of the footwear industry in Spain. The main airport of the province of Alicante (Alicante–Elche Miguel Hernández Airport) is located inside Elche's municipality, and it serves both Elche and Alicante, being the fifth-busiest airport in Spain.

Together with Alicante and other municipalities, Elche forms a conurbation of around 0.8 million inhabitants. The city is noted for its urban Palm Grove, designated as World Heritage Site.

== History ==
=== Ancient Ilici ===
Located within the current municipal limits 3 km from the current city's location downstream of the Vinalopó, the neighbouring site of La Alcudia/Ilici achieved the consolidation of its urban structure already by the early 5th century BCE, eventually becoming the centre of power of a local Phocaean-Iberian amphictyony in the Lower Vinapoló and Segura region. It resurfaced as a colonia under Roman rule, connected to maritime transport via the Portus Ilicitanus, and became a bishopric in late antiquity. After the Treaty of Tudmir and particularly upon the 9th century development of Murcia as the new centre of Umayyad power in southeastern Iberia, the site underwent decay.

=== Middle Ages ===
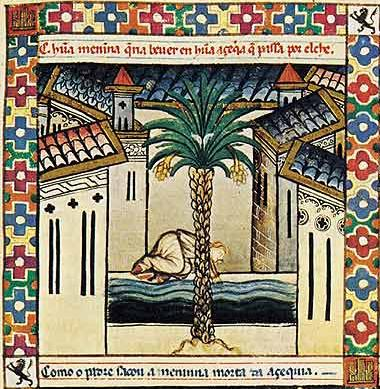
Miniature of the Cantiga #133 accounting for an alleged miracle that took place in Elche (13th century), entailing, together with Cantiga #126, the first graphic representation of a palm tree in Elche

Parallel to the decay of the site of former Ilici, the founding of scattered rural settlements (alquerías) and the new Islamic city of Madinat Ilš on the current location took place. Featuring an almost rectangular floor plan, the Islamic city of Madinat Ilš was endowed with a walled perimeter, dated from the second half of the 10th century to the first third of the 11th century. The city walls were refurbished and improved in the 12th century under the rule of Ibn Mardanīsh over the Taifa of Murcia.

In the 13th century, the taifa of Murcia underwent vassalization to Castile and, following the Mudéjar Revolt, its eventual eventual military conquest by Aragonese forces on behalf of Castile. Previously attached to the Lordship of Villena, the disputed rule over Elche was settled in favour of the Crown of Aragon following the 1304 Sentence of Torrellas and the 1305 Treaty of Elche, and so it was incorporated into the Kingdom of Valencia.

In the 13th and 14th centuries, the population in the Lower Vinalopó area remained mainly Muslim, and Elche constituted, together with Crevillent, the top morería in terms of fiscal contributions to the Crown all over the Governorate of Orihuela. While being nothing more than a modest town halfway Alicante and Orihuela throughout the middle ages under Christian rule, Elche also had a small but noted Jewish community. Similarly to other Jewish communities within the Governorate of Orihuela, the local aljama was granted privileges under the reign of James II, eliciting antisemitic backslash. Likewise, although its insertion in international trade networks was handicapped by the prowess of the neighbouring port of Alicante, the town developed nonetheless a certain degree of commercial dynamism in the Late Middle Ages.

=== Modern era ===
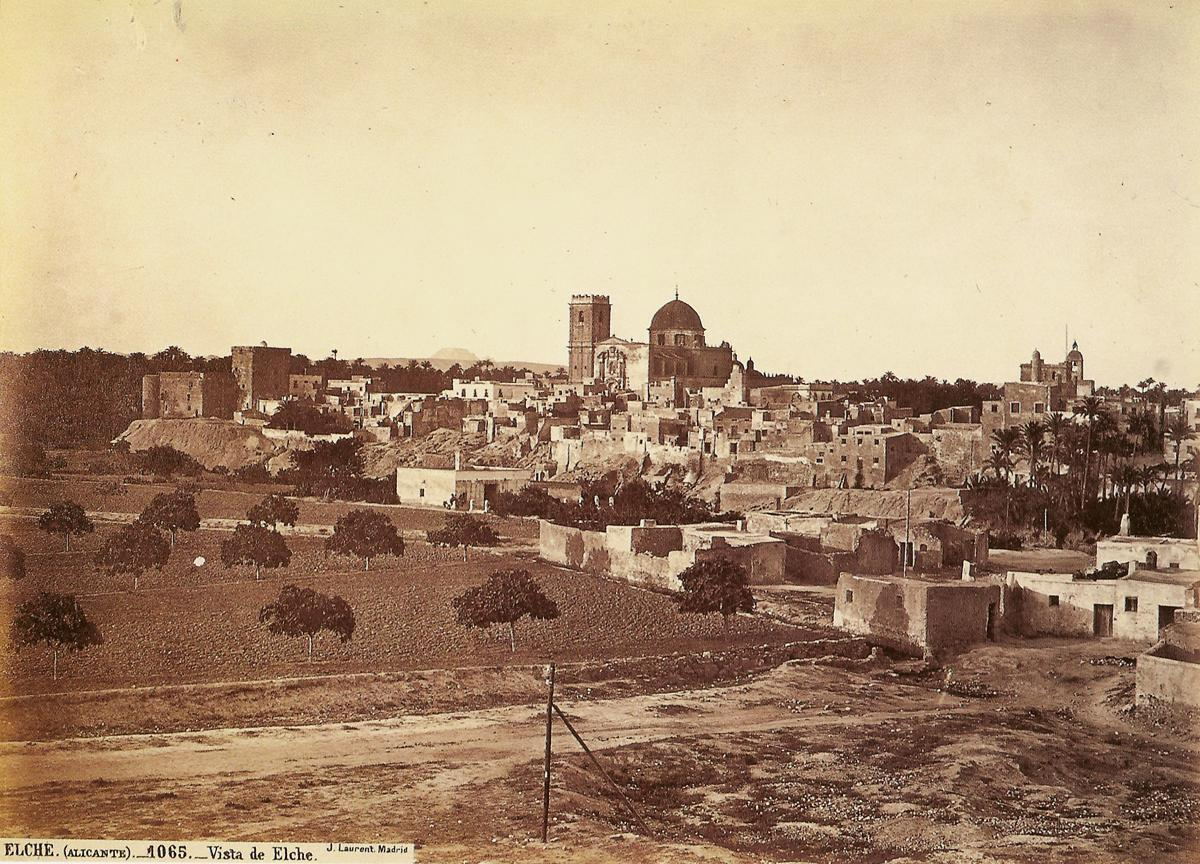
19th century photograph of Elche by Jean Laurent

The urban patricians consistently opposed the creation of the lordship in Elche in 1470 and its subsequent separation from royal domain. In line with the longstanding resent to the seigneurial rule of the Cárdenas, Elche was active in the early 16th-century Revolt of the Brotherhoods. As in other towns of the Kingdom of Valencia with sizeable Muslim population, the mudéjares in Elche sided with the monarchy and the aristocracy against the brotherhoods. Towards 1563, the moriscos amounted to a 40% of the population.

In a context of droughts and scarcity suffered in the area during the Maldá Anomaly (one of the pulses of the Little Ice Age) in the late 18th century, an anti-seigneurial revolt erupted in Elche in the Spring of 1766. The town grew throughout the 18th century and became more important during the 19th century with the arrival of the railway and a booming industrial development of what used to be the traditional footwear industry. Elche was granted the title of city by King Amadeo in 1871. The espadrille industry developed in the 19th century, eventually becoming the leading Spanish municipality at producing textile footwear. By the late century, local entrepreneurs began to invest in leather footwear factories. The footwear industry grew during the Great War and thereafter.

== Geography ==
The city is known for the Palmeral de Elche, that is an UNESCO World Heritage Site and is the only palm grove in Europe with North African origins and the largest on the continent. The Palm Grove also constitutes the northernmost and one of the largest palm groves in the world. Today, the city of Elche contains 97 orchards composed of 70,000 date palms, concentrated in the east bank of the Vinalopó. Outside the Elche city domain, other large plantations contain approximately 130,000 date palms. In total, Elche and its vicinity hold 200,000 palms. The Palm Grove ranges over 3.5 km^{2} (1.4 sq mi), including 1.5 km^{2} (0.58 sq mi) within the city of Elche. The Palm Grove of Elche comprises the National Artistic Garden, Palm Grove Museum, Route of El Palmeral, and Municipal Park.

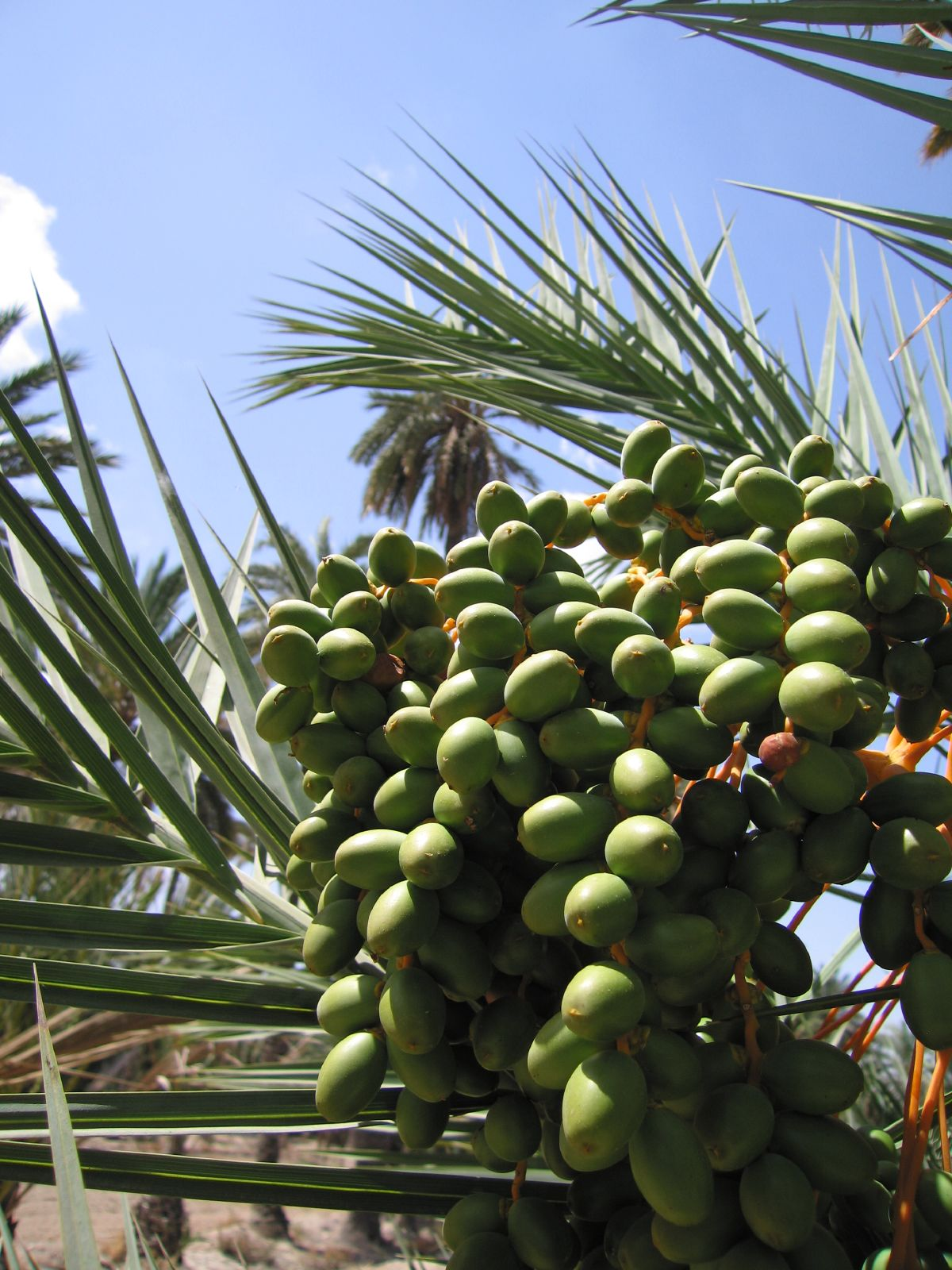
Date fruit from date palm trees within the National Artistic Garden

It shares borders with Santa Pola, Guardamar del Segura, San Fulgencio, Dolores, Catral, Crevillent, Aspe, Monforte del Cid and Alicante. The most remarkable landform is Vinalopó River.

According to the Spanish Statistical Institute, there are 20 localities in the municipality besides the main town. The main town had a population of 190,821 in 2019 The number of people living in the other localities came up to 41,821 in the same year. Algoda was home to 2,650 people, Algorós has a population of 638, Altabix was inhabited by 2,829 people, El Altet was home to 5,750 people Atsavares was home to 1,328 people, Asprella had a population of 403, Las Bayas was home to 2,975 people, Carrús was inhabited by 1,300 people, Daimés had a population of 1,190, El Derramador was home to 419 people, La Foia was inhabited by 2,804 people, Jubalcoi had a population of 1,215, El Pla de Sant Josep was home to 2,411 people, Maitino was inhabited by 890 people, La Marina had a population of 2,008, La Perleta was home to 1,376 people, Puçol was inhabited by 900 people, Torrellano had a population of 7,480, Vallverda was home to 1,767 people and Los Arenales del Sol was inhabited by 2,019 people.

The local government also acknowledges Matola, which is part of Algoda according to the Spanish Statistical Institute; Penya de les Àguiles, which is part of El Pla de Sant Josep according to the same institution, and Santa Anna, which is not recognised by the Statistical Institute.

=== Climate ===
Elche has a hot semi-arid climate (Köppen climate classification: BSh) close to a desert climate (BWh) with mild, dry winters and hot, dry summers. The city enjoys between 2,900 and 3,000 hours of sunshine per year and the rainfall is scarce year-round.

Elche's annual average temperature is above 18 °C (64 °F). The hottest temperature ever recorded was 43.2 °C (109.8 °F) on 12 July 2021 while the coldest temperature ever recorded was −5.0 °C (23.0 °F) on 12 February 1956.

Climate data for Alicante–Elche Airport, 1981-2010 normals, 1967-2023 extremes
Month	Jan	Feb	Mar	Apr	May	Jun	Jul	Aug	Sep	Oct	Nov	Dec	Year
Record high °C (°F)	28.3 (82.9)	29.2 (84.6)	34.8 (94.6)	34.6 (94.3)	38.0 (100.4)	38.9 (102.0)	43.4 (110.1)	40.8 (105.4)	39.8 (103.6)	34.3 (93.7)	31.0 (87.8)	27.4 (81.3)	43.4 (110.1)
Mean daily maximum °C (°F)	16.7 (62.1)	17.4 (63.3)	19.4 (66.9)	21.1 (70.0)	23.8 (74.8)	27.6 (81.7)	30.2 (86.4)	31.4 (88.5)	28.5 (83.3)	24.7 (76.5)	20.3 (68.5)	17.3 (63.1)	23.5 (74.3)
Daily mean °C (°F)	11.6 (52.9)	12.3 (54.1)	14.0 (57.2)	15.9 (60.6)	18.9 (66.0)	22.8 (73.0)	25.5 (77.9)	26.3 (79.3)	23.8 (74.8)	19.8 (67.6)	15.4 (59.7)	12.5 (54.5)	18.4 (65.1)
Mean daily minimum °C (°F)	6.5 (43.7)	7.1 (44.8)	8.7 (47.7)	10.7 (51.3)	13.9 (57.0)	18.0 (64.4)	20.8 (69.4)	21.5 (70.7)	19.0 (66.2)	14.9 (58.8)	10.6 (51.1)	7.5 (45.5)	13.3 (55.9)
Record low °C (°F)	−7.8 (18.0)	−2.4 (27.7)	−0.9 (30.4)	0.7 (33.3)	4.4 (39.9)	10.3 (50.5)	13.6 (56.5)	14.0 (57.2)	10.0 (50.0)	3.0 (37.4)	−0.2 (31.6)	−1.8 (28.8)	−7.8 (18.0)
Average rainfall mm (inches)	21 (0.8)	20 (0.8)	20 (0.8)	27 (1.1)	28 (1.1)	10 (0.4)	3 (0.1)	5 (0.2)	40 (1.6)	46 (1.8)	34 (1.3)	22 (0.9)	276 (10.9)
Average rainy days (≥ 1 mm)	3.6	2.9	3.1	3.7	3.7	1.6	0.7	0.9	3.3	4.1	3.8	3.7	35.1
Average relative humidity (%)	61	61	60	57	59	58	59	61	63	64	63	61	61
Mean monthly sunshine hours	184	179	221	251	291	316	344	313	243	218	174	165	2,953
Source: Agencia Estatal de Meteorología

Climate data for Baix Vinalopó, 1981-2010
Month	Jan	Feb	Mar	Apr	May	Jun	Jul	Aug	Sep	Oct	Nov	Dec	Year
Record high °C (°F)	26 (79)	27 (81)	29 (84)	35 (95)	39 (102)	40 (104)	43 (109)	42 (108)	39 (102)	35 (95)	30 (86)	25 (77)	43 (109)
Mean daily maximum °C (°F)	15.0 (59.0)	15.4 (59.7)	18.4 (65.1)	20.9 (69.6)	24.2 (75.6)	28.1 (82.6)	31.4 (88.5)	31.6 (88.9)	28.4 (83.1)	24.4 (75.9)	18.7 (65.7)	15.2 (59.4)	22.6 (72.8)
Daily mean °C (°F)	10.3 (50.5)	10.8 (51.4)	13.4 (56.1)	15.7 (60.3)	19.1 (66.4)	22.9 (73.2)	25.9 (78.6)	25.9 (78.6)	23.1 (73.6)	19.5 (67.1)	14.5 (58.1)	10.9 (51.6)	17.7 (63.8)
Mean daily minimum °C (°F)	5.6 (42.1)	5.8 (42.4)	8.2 (46.8)	11.1 (52.0)	13.9 (57.0)	17.8 (64.0)	20.7 (69.3)	21.1 (70.0)	18.6 (65.5)	14.8 (58.6)	9.7 (49.5)	6.2 (43.2)	12.8 (55.0)
Record low °C (°F)	−5 (23)	−7 (19)	−2 (28)	2 (36)	5 (41)	9 (48)	13 (55)	11 (52)	9 (48)	4 (39)	−1 (30)	−3 (27)	−7 (19)
Average rainfall mm (inches)	17.3 (0.68)	19.1 (0.75)	21.5 (0.85)	31.2 (1.23)	21.7 (0.85)	18.7 (0.74)	4.5 (0.18)	5.3 (0.21)	28.0 (1.10)	46.4 (1.83)	31.8 (1.25)	20.2 (0.80)	265.7 (10.47)
Average rainy days (≥ 1.0 mm)	3.6	2.9	3.1	3.7	3.7	1.6	0.7	0.9	3.3	4.1	3.8	3.7	35.1
Source: Ayuntamiento de Elche

== Demographics ==
Historical population
Year	Pop.	±%
1842	18,068	—
1857	19,533	+8.1%
1877	19,596	+0.3%
1887	23,917	+22.1%
1900	27,430	+14.7%
1910	30,713	+12.0%
1920	33,187	+8.1%
1930	36,995	+11.5%
1940	46,496	+25.7%
1950	56,341	+21.2%
1960	73,720	+30.8%
1970	123,716	+67.8%
1981	164,779	+33.2%
1991	188,062	+14.1%
2001	194,767	+3.6%
2011	227,417	+16.8%
2021	235,566	+3.6%
Source: INE

As of 2024, the foreign-born population is 41,700, equal to 17.2% of the total population. The 5 largest foreign nationalities are Colombians (7,323), Moroccans (5,975), Romanians (2,727), Argentinians (2,377) and Ecuadorians (2,014).

Foreign population by country of birth (2024)
Country	Population
Colombia	7,323
Morocco	5,975
Romania	2,727
Argentina	2,377
Ecuador	2,014
Venezuela	1,968
China	1,699
Algeria	1,581
France	1,494
Paraguay	1,421
Ukraine	906
Cuba	837
United Kingdom	835
Senegal	731
Mali	656

== Economy ==
The economy of Elche is based, in large part, on the footwear industry, with over 1,000 shoe factories, being one of the most important footwear centres in Spain and the rest of Europe with brands like Pura Lopez, Kelme or Panama Jack. There are other economic activities in Elche: agriculture (dates, olives, cereals and pomegranates), although it has lost importance in recent years; rubber industry; trade, which employs 20% of the workforce; aerospace (PLD Space); and tourism.

Elche has a conference centre (called Ciutat d'Elx), an international airport (Aeropuerto de Alicante), a public University, Universidad Miguel Hernández, and a private University, Universidad CEU Cardenal Herrera.

== Culture ==
=== Cultural theatrical spaces ===
==== The Grand Theater ====
The Elche Grand Theater is a theatrical space constructed at the beginning of the 20th Century, created by the architect Alfonso Garín. It was opened in 1920 with the name Kursaal Theater. The interior of the room is in a horseshoe shape, where an orchestra section in front of the stage and two amphitheaters with box seats on the sides can be found. At the beginning of the 90s, the building was acquired by the local government, becoming municipal property. After a reform, the theater was reopened on May 16, 1996, by Queen Sofía. The theater is found in the historical area of the city, very close to the Glorieta. The Grand Theater houses all types of theatrical, dance, and musical performances.

==== L’Escorxador Centre for Contemporary Culture ====
Opened on November 7, 2008, in the installations of the old Elche Slaughterhouse - constructed in the decade of 1940 - is a 5000 m^{2} space oriented to the young public. The complex is divided into four pavilions: in the first one there is a theatrical space with more than 150 chairs, allocated for housing theatrical, resonant, and visual art shows; the second pavilion, called The Nave, is home to the multipurpose room where plastic art exhibitions, as well as open essays and special representations of performance, theater and music, are celebrated; in the third, rehearsal rooms that are available for rent, loan or assignment for the sound arts can be found; the fourth pavilion is the most spacious of the four, and houses the different studios that the center has as well as a small room of temporary exhibitions called Sala Lanart. In addition to the pavilions, the centre has - since 2009 - a terrace in which performances and projections can be carried out outside.

==== La Llotja Cultural Room ====
The room is located in the remodelled installations of the old fruit and vegetable market from the Altabix neighbourhood constructed between 1941 and 1942. It was opened on April 12, 2008, and is a place where dance, theater, and music shows intended for young audiences are carried out, as well as school graduations and other events that can take place in it. In the time of elections, it is used as an electoral college.

=== Museums ===
==== Alejandro Ramos Folqués Archaeological and History Museum of Elche ====
The Alejandro Ramos Folqués Archaeological and History Museum of Elche has been turned into an archaeological cultural model at a regional level of great importance. Situated in the interior of the Altamira Palace - in the Elche historical center and very close to Saint María basilica - it was opened on May 18, 2006, with a grand exhibition about Iberic culture, among where the Lady of Elche was found - one of the most significant pieces of Iberic art, transferred temporarily by the National Archaeological Museum for six months (from May 18 to November 1, 2006).

Like a permanent exhibition, the museum offers a general overview of the distinct stages that have been taking place in the city, such as the Neolithic, the Copper Age, the Bronze Age, the Iberian stage, the process of Romanization, the Visigothic era, and the Islamic settlement (current site of the city) until the present.

The archaeological remains come from, among others, the Alcudia site, Elche Park (situated in one of the gardens in the city and which has provided important sculptural remains) and El Arenero de Monforte del Cid.

==== Festa Museum ====
The Festa Museum, about the Mystery of Elche, originated with the intention of showing La Festa to the visitors that come to the city throughout the year. The museum is made of two rooms: the first is where scenic tradition that involves the Mystery is collected, which can be posters, sketches, crowns, costumes, guitars...and the other is a more dynamic room, where new technologies are used, combining many visual images like typical smells and sounds from La Festa. Part of the museum is located in what was Saint Sebastian's Shrine, which is also closely linked to Assumptionist drama and was restored for the purpose of creating the museum.

Palm Grove Museum (Palmeral Museum)

==== Museo del Palmeral ====
The Palm Grove Museum, found in a traditional house of the Garden of Saint Placidus (Huerto de San Plácido), close to the Garden of Healing (Huerto del Cura). The museum is dedicated to recognizing the municipal relationship with the palm groves. It shows the origins, history, culture of the palm grove, as well as the uses and its evolution. In the rooms, an overview of the history of the Palm Grove is shown through videos, panels, demonstrative elements and sounds, which continues with a visit to its own garden outside.

==== The Traditional Culture Centre Pusol School Museum ====
The Traditional Culture Center Pusol School Museum was created in the year 1969 as an activity linked to the Pedagogical Project "The School and its Fear," which developed the study of the purposes and traditions of the Field of Elche (Campo de Elche). In the museum, unique collections are housed that show distinct ethnological aspects (agriculture, business, industry, folklore, traditions, etc.) available for scientific studies at all levels. In 2009, it was included by UNESCO in the Register of Good Safeguarding Practices for Intangible Cultural Heritage.

In addition to these, other museums and places of interest exist in Elche:

- Paleontological Museum in the plaza of Saint Juan Church.
- Alcudia Museum, situated in the archaeological site where the Lady of Elche was found.
- Museum of Contemporary Art, in the Raval neighborhood.
- Museum of the Assumption of the Virgin, Patron Saint of Elche Museum dedicated to the Assumption of the Virgin.
- Visitors center in the Municipal Park, with audiovisual projections about the city.
- Municipal Centre of Exhibitions, with seasonal nature exhibitions.
- The Centre of Exhibitions of the Lonja, which is situated on the first floor of the Town Hall, occasionally houses exhibitions, primarily with themes related to the city.
- Espai d'Art, a walk near the Municipal Park with contemporary art sculptures.
- Arabian baths, which are found in the inside of the Clarisas Convent.

=== Festivities ===
- Holy Week: as generally in Spain, several processions (festive religious parades) occur during the festive period. with the Elche Palm Sunday Procession being a Fiesta of International Tourist Interest
- Moros i Cristians: it occurs in the first fortnight of August. The theme of this festivity is the Muslim rule that occurred in the High Middle Ages and part of the Late Middle Ages and the battles which took place between Christians and Muslims as a consequence of this occupation. A more specific subject of this festivity is the Reconquista.
- Nit de la Roà: it takes place in mid-August.
- Christmas: A nativity scene is placed in the town and a living nativity scene also occurs during the festive period. A parade which theme is the Three Wise Men is also performed in the Epiphany's Eve (5 January).

== Main sights ==
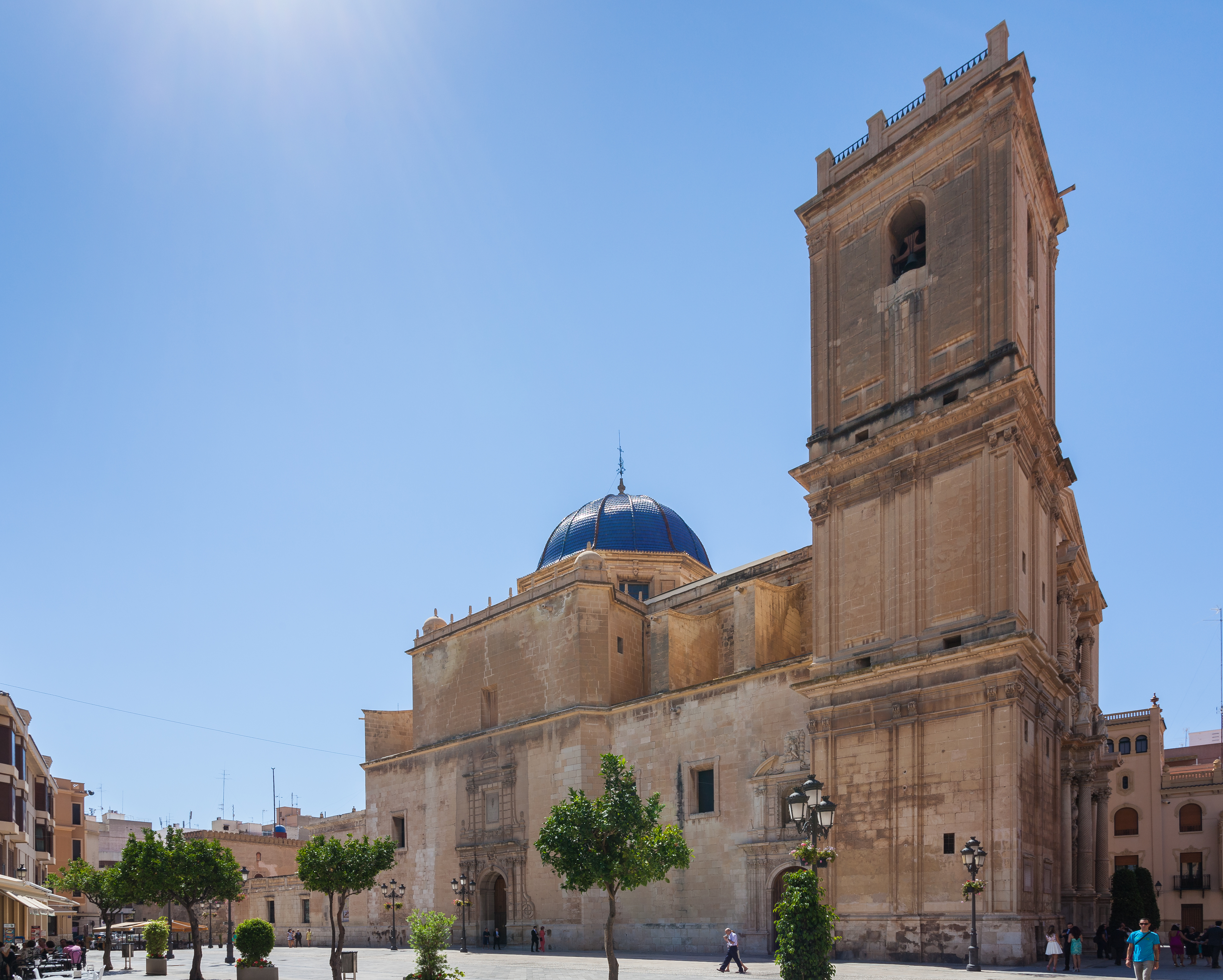
Basilica of Santa María de Elche

Palmeral of Elche ("The Palm Grove of Elche")

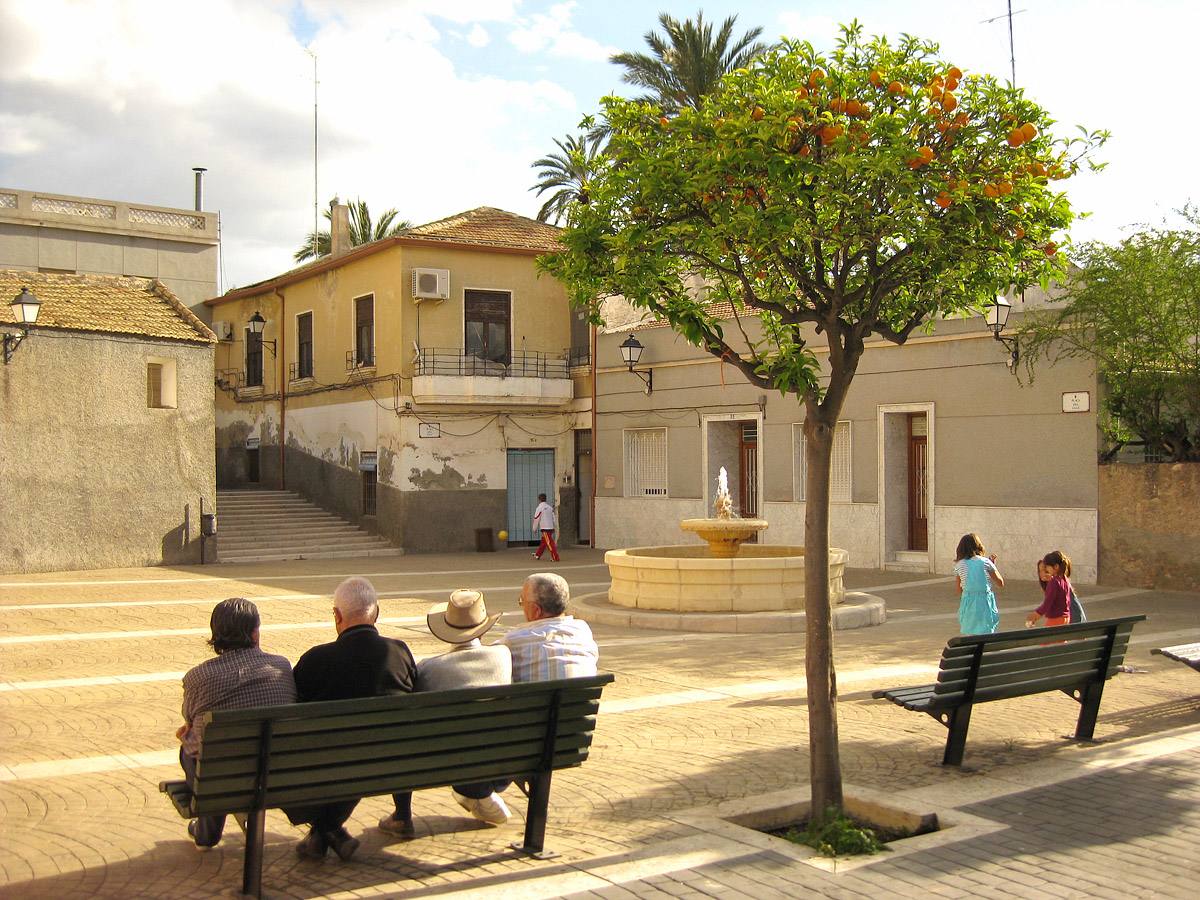
Old part of the city, Barrio del Raval

- Palmeral of Elche ("The Palm Grove of Elche", Palmerar d'Elx in Valencian). It is an orchard of over 200,000 palm trees that was declared a World Heritage Site by UNESCO in 2000.
- Altamira Castle, also known as Alcázar de la Señoría, located next to the Municipal Park (which, in turn, is a part of the Elche Palm Grove). It was originally built in Almohad times (12th-13th centuries), and was later renovated with brick exterior in the 15th century. A former fortress, in 1913 it became a fabric plant, it has also been used as the town hall and as a prison during the Spanish Civil War, while today is home to the Elche Archaeology and History Museum.
- Baños Arabes (Arabic Baths), which re-uses old Roman baths.
- Basilica of Santa Maria: The current temple was built in 1672. Previously, there were other temples in the same place, but they disappeared owing to several factors. It has a la Latin-cross plan, a large nave and four side chapels. A large dome has been constructed over the crossing.
- Calahorra Tower, of rectangular plan and Arabic origin, it represents the last relic of the old city walls.
- Municipio (Town Hall): it includes a tower named la torre del consell, and it is the most ancient structure in the south of the Valencian Community. It was built in the mid-15th century.
- Convento de la Merced: it was built in a place where there were Arabic baths. It dates back to 1270, when the prince Juan Manuel bestowed the baths to the grand master of a religious order.
- Huerto del Cura: it is part of the Palmeral of Elche and hosts nearly 500 palm trees. There are individuals of the imperial palm species.
- Elche Palaeontological Museum: more than 1,200 fossils are on display in the museum. Some elements such as remains of mastodons and replicas of dinosaurs are placed in the building.
- Elche Municipal Festa Museum: it was built in 1997 and it hosts elements about the Misteri d'Elx performance.
- Palm Groves Museum: This museum is allocated in a traditional 19th-century building. This museum is devoted to the history, the evolution and the characteristics of the Palmeral of Elche.

The Mystery Play of Elx (better known as Misteri d'Elx, in Valencian) is a sacral-lyrical medieval drama, dated from the 15th century, which was declared a Masterpiece of the Oral and Intangible Heritage of Humanity by UNESCO in 2002. It is played every year in mid-August, in the context of the local holidays dedicated to the Assumption of Virgin Mary. Also as a part of this celebration, on 13 August is the date of a celebration in Elche called Nit de l'Albà (Night of the Dawn) in which a citywide night-long show of fireworks takes place.

== Transport ==
The Alicante–Elche Airport, the fifth-busiest in Spain is located in the municipality of Elche, around 10 kilometres (6.2 miles) east from the city centre.

There is a railway linking Alicante and Murcia del Carmen which runs through a single track tunnel underneath the city, with two underground stations; Elche-Parque (Valencian: Elx-Parc) and Elche-Carrús (Valencian: Elx-Carrús). These are served by line C–1 of the Cercanías Murcia/Alicante commuter rail service, along with Media Distancia trains between Valencia Nord station and Murcia.

The Madrid–Levante high-speed rail network was extended to reach a station named Elx/Elche AV in the Matola area in 2021, branching off from the line to Alicante near Monforte del Cid. The AVE station contains parking space for 500 cars and 50 motorcycles.

Urban buses (Autobuses Urbanos de Elche S.A.), operate a number of circular routes throughout the city, and since 2025, also operate services to the hamlets surrounding the city. These service the high speed AVE station Elche-Matola, Alicante–Elche Airport and nearly costal hamlets of El Altet, Arenales del Sol and La Marina.

The city's bus station is serviced by a number of companies offering regional and long-distance destinations. The Elx Rodalia service, operated by Vectalia Movilidad, connects the city with nearby destinations like Alicante, Crevillente and Santa Pola. The transport company Alsa, offer bus services to destinations further afield like, Valencia, Barcelona and Madrid.

The Autopista AP-7 (Autopista del Mediterráneo) which serves the east and southern coastlines of the country, serves the outskirts of the city.

== Notable people ==
- Marceliano Coquillat (1865–1924), architect
- Saúl Ñíguez (born 1994), footballer.
- Aarón Ñíguez (born 1989), footballer
- Sílvia Soler Espinosa (born 1987), former tennis player. She played in tournaments in the WTA. Her record position was semifinalist in the Strasbourg tour.
- Francisco Mojica (born 1963), microbiologist, noted for his research on the CRISPR gene editing technique

== Twin towns and sister cities ==
- Toulouse, France
- San Bartolomé de Tirajana, Spain
- Jaca, Spain

== See also ==
- Elche CF
- Medieval Festival of Elx
- Route of the Castles of Vinalopó
