= La Alcudia =

- L'Alcúdia
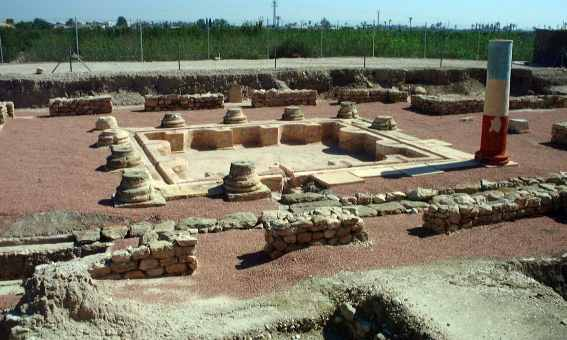
- Interactive map of La Alcudia
- 38°14′21″N 0°41′43″W
- Location: Elche, Valencian Community, Spain

History
- Abandoned: Middle Ages

La Alcudia, also l'Alcúdia, is an archaeological site in the Province of Alicante, Spain, near Elche and the Vinalopó river, corresponding to the ancient city of Ilici.

== Geography ==
The coastline of the lower Segura and Vinalopó región has changed substantially in the last 15,000 years, and by 1 CE, the site was located in one of the two branches of the Vinalopó delta that discharged into a now disappeared Sinus Ilicitanus.

== History ==
It has been intermittently inhabited for six millennia, with the earliest phase of occupation corresponding to the Neolithic. It was a noted centre in the Iberian period. During the Roman period, it was refounded as Colonia Iulia Ilici c. 43-42 BCE and as Colonia Iulia Ilici Augusta c. 27-26 BCE. Noted ruins from late antiquity include a Christian church, identified by some as a synagogue. (Note: The synagogue proposal was driven by the finding of texts on the paviment identified as Jewish, although Helmut Schlunk proved the existence of such texts in other Eastern churches.) Following the 8th-century Islamic conquest the place languished.

It was declared bien de interés cultural in 1992.
