= Martín del Río =

- Flag Coat of arms

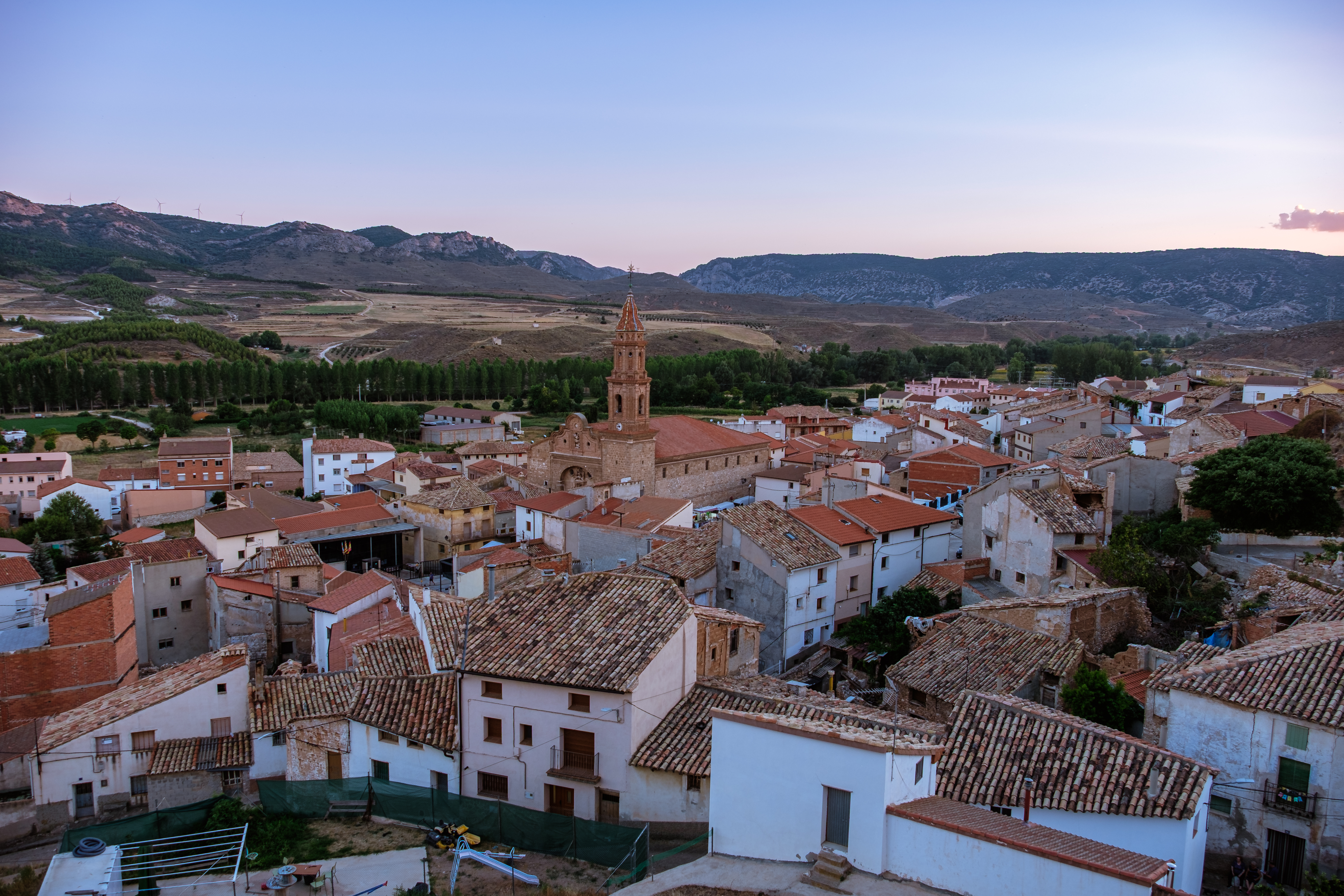

- Location within Spain
- Coordinates: 40°51′N 0°53′W
- Country: Spain
- Autonomous community: Aragon
- Province: Teruel
- Comarca: Cuencas Mineras

Area
  - Total: 54.88 km^{2} (21.19 sq mi)
- Elevation: 909 m (2,982 ft)

Population (2025-01-01)
  - Total: 367
  - Density: 6.69/km^{2} (17.3/sq mi)
- Time zone: UTC+1 (CET)
  - Summer (DST): UTC+2 (CEST)

Martín del Río is a municipality and locality in the province of Teruel, in the autonomous community of Aragon, Spain.

== Geography ==
Integrated into the Cuencas Mineras comarca, it lies 78 km from the provincial capital. The municipality is crossed by the N-211 road between kilometre points 157 and 164. It covers an area of 54.88 km² with a population of 372 inhabitants (INE 2022) and a population density of 8.49 inhabitants/km².

The relief of the municipality is characterised by the Teruel sector of the Iberian System, softened by the presence of the Martín River, which rises within the territory at the confluence of the Parras River, the Rambla River and the Vivel River, flowing towards Montalbán. Elevation ranges from 1,368 m in the southwest (Cantera de las Umbrías) to 870 m on the banks of the Martín River. The village stands at 909 m above sea level.

Neighbouring municipalities

The municipality of Martín del Río borders Vivel del Río Martín, Montalbán, Pancrudo and Utrillas.

== Toponymy ==
The name Martín del Río has evolved over the centuries. Originally it was simply called Martín, but in the 18th century del Río was added to distinguish it from other places with the same name. In fact, in Salamanca there was another Martín del Río, which was renamed Martín de Yeltes in 1902.

The earliest documentary mentions date from the 12th century: "Martín" (1158), "Río d’Martín" (1173) and "Martino" (1189).

The most widely accepted hypotheses are:

- Latin origin, derived from a Roman landowner named Martius → Martinus → Martín.
- Medieval origin, linked to a settler named Martino or Martín during the repopulation period.

The municipality should not be confused with San Martín del Río.

== History ==
=== Prehistory and Antiquity ===
Archaeological evidence indicates human presence since the Paleolithic. Within the municipal area, sites from the Late Bronze Age and the Iron Age I–II have been documented, as well as remains of Iberian and Roman culture.

=== Middle Ages ===
In the area known as El Pajazo, remains from different historical periods have been found. In 2024, Visigothic burials were discovered, confirming the presence of a settlement from that period, while in 2017 a medieval necropolis of Andalusi chronology was excavated. These finds, together with the remains of a fortress on the upper part of the village, indicate continuity of occupation in Martín del Río during both the Visigothic period and Muslim rule.

In the mid-12th century, the area was conquered by the Kingdom of Aragon under the rule of Ramon Berenguer IV. The first written mention of Martín del Río appears in a papal bull of 1158 delimiting territories of the Archdiocese of Zaragoza. In this context, the place was granted in tenencia to Galindo Jiménez II of Pozán, following the practice of the time to ensure administration and defence.

In 1173, King Alfonso II confirmed the Fueros of Daroca, granting fiscal and military benefits to frontier localities, including Martín del Río. At the end of the 13th century, the village became part of the Community of Villages of Teruel within the Sesma of the Martín River; historical documents record the participation of its representatives in the assemblies of the Community.

=== Early Modern period ===
According to a census from the late 15th century, Martín del Río had 21 "fuegos" (≈100 inhabitants). During the Early Modern period, it experienced notable growth, reaching approximately 400 inhabitants by 1777. During this stage, the urban core was consolidated and prominent buildings such as the church and the chapel of the Saints were erected.

=== Contemporary period ===
By the mid-19th century, the locality had a recorded population of 448 inhabitants. It is described in the eleventh volume of the Diccionario geográfico-estadístico-histórico de España y sus posesiones de Ultramar by Pascual Madoz as follows:

MARTIN DEL RIO: a village with a town council in the province of Teruel (10 leagues), judicial district of Segura (1½), diocese and territorial court of Zaragoza (19), captaincy general of Aragon. Situated on the right bank of the Martín River, from which it takes its name, on a slope facing south; it enjoys good ventilation and a healthy climate. It consists of about 110 houses of medium construction, forming a single settlement; it has a parish church dedicated to the Assumption of Mary, served by a parish priest and two chaplains; the church is Gothic in style, with three naves of regular height; there is a public school attended by a small number of children, and a cemetery that poses no threat to public health. It borders Vivel to the north; Montalbán to the east; Utrillas and Las Parras de Martín to the south; and La Rambla de Martín to the west. Within it rises a spring of excellent water which, together with the Martín River, irrigates several plots of land; one hour from the village are farmsteads known as Los Pojazos, among rocky outcrops on the road to Las Parras, where there is a flour mill. The land is partly flat with some ravines and hills; it has a fine alluvial plain with many fruit trees and poplars, watered by streams from Vivel, La Rambla and Las Parras. The roads are bridle paths between neighbouring villages. Mail arrives from the district capital twice a week. Produce includes wheat, barley, oats, hemp, silk, potatoes, onions, saffron and various vegetables; there is little sheep and cattle farming, and game such as rabbits and partridges. Industry consists of agriculture, a flour mill and some linen looms. Population: 112 households, 448 inhabitants. Taxable wealth: 50,461 reales. In 1839, while the Carlist leader Ramón Cabrera was besieging Montalbán, he established his headquarters in Martín del Río, where he was joined by the well-known José Arias Teijeiro, minister of Don Carlos, who, following the shootings in Estella, fled from the Basque Provinces to join Aragon.

(Madoz 1848, p. 260)

At the beginning of the 20th century, the company Minas y Ferrocarriles de Utrillas (Utrillas Mines and Railways) built a railway complex in the municipal area with numerous facilities, from mineral washing plants to warehouses and locomotive sheds. It became the terminus of the Utrillas railway, linking the mining area with Zaragoza and enabling coal output to be transported. The railway also improved communications between local towns and Zaragoza. The facilities remained in service for more than half a century, until the decline of rail activity led to the closure of the line in 1966. Lignite mining boosted the population from 611 inhabitants (1900) to 926 (1950); thereafter, rural exodus caused a sharp decline. Mining activity ceased in 2002 with the closure of MFU (Minas y Ferrocarriles de Utrillas).

The Spanish Civil War had a strong impact on Martín del Río, which remained under Republican control between 1936 and 1938. The municipality witnessed the activity of the Macià-Companys Column and the 30th Republican Division, which fortified the surroundings with trenches and shelters, while nearby Vivel del Río, taken by the Nationalists in February 1937, turned the area into a front line for more than a year. In March 1938, during the Aragon Offensive, Nationalist troops occupied the village after heavy fighting.

== Administration and politics ==
| Term | Mayor | Party |
|---|---|---|
| 1979–1983 | Tomás Valiente Julve | PSOE-Aragón |
| 1983–1987 | Tomás Valiente Julve | PSOE-Aragón |
| 1987–1991 | Francisco Javier Altaba Cabañero | PSOE-Aragón |
| 1991–1995 | Francisco Javier Altaba Cabañero | PSOE-Aragón |
| 1995–1999 | Francisco Javier Altaba Cabañero | PSOE-Aragón |
| 1999–2003 | Francisco Javier Altaba Cabañero | PSOE-Aragón |
| 2003–2007 | Francisco Javier Altaba Cabañero | PSOE-Aragón |
| 2007–2011 | Francisco Javier Altaba Cabañero | PSOE-Aragón |
| 2011–2012 | Francisco Javier Altaba Cabañero | PSOE-Aragón |
| 2012–2015 | José Antonio Muñoz Barberán | PSOE-Aragón |
| 2015–2019 | Francisco Martínez López | PSOE-Aragón |
| 2019–2023 | Francisco Martínez López | PSOE-Aragón |
| 2023–2027 | Manuel del Río Burriel | PSOE-Aragón |

== Heritage ==
=== Natural attractions ===
Among its natural tourist attractions is:

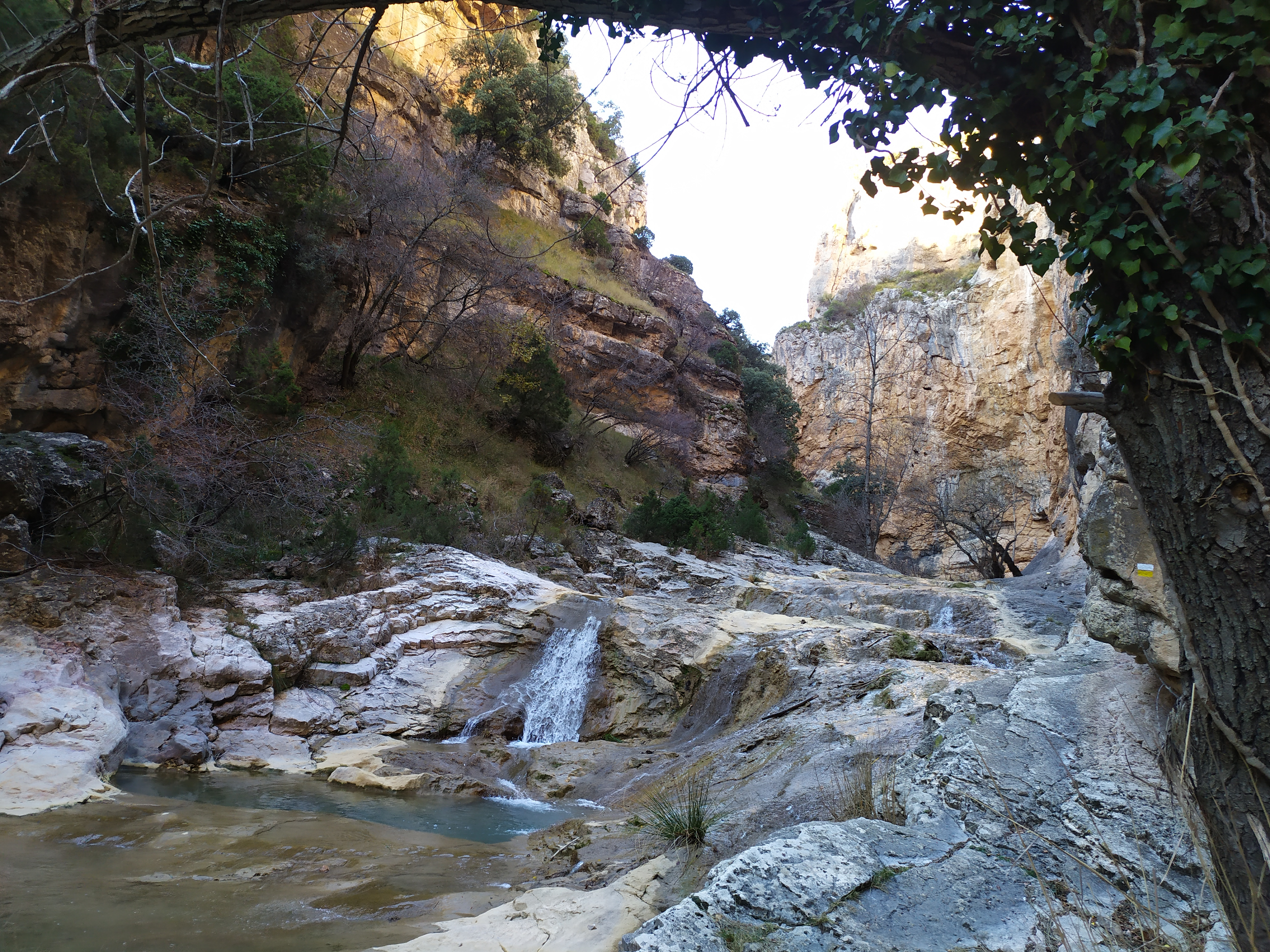
Hocino de la Rambla (Martín del Río)

- Hocino de la Rambla: a gorge located west of the urban centre of Martín del Río, carved by the Rambla River. The site combines riparian vegetation—with poplars, willows and rushes—with limestone cliffs, where Spanish ibex and griffon vultures are frequently observed. Its most characteristic feature is the Pozo de las Televisiones, a waterfall that flows among large rock blocks and beside which rectangular cavities can be seen in the rock face, whose appearance recalls old television sets and gave the place its name. The waterfall currently marks the end of the hiking route, although there are plans to extend the itinerary by about 500 m upstream through a municipal project involving walkways and protective elements, enabling a circular route connecting with the PR-TE 96 trail.

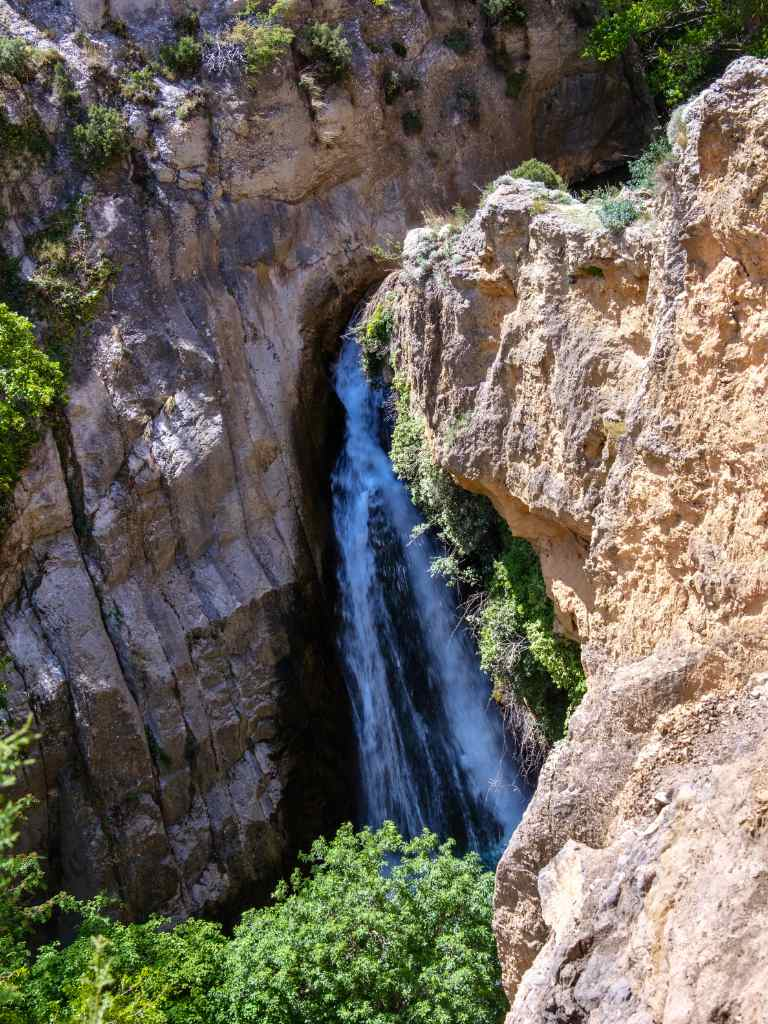
Cascada del Pajazo (Martín del Río)

- Hocino del Pajazo: named after the former neighbourhood of El Pajazo, flooded following the construction of the Embalse de las Parras reservoir. It is located southwest of Martín del Río, following the course of the Parras River. The path enters a limestone gorge where, during periods of rainfall or snowmelt, the water forms the Cascada del Pajazo, a 14 m drop visible from a natural viewpoint. Further upstream, already within the municipality of Las Parras de Martín, a footbridge leads to the Pozo de las Palomas, a waterfall emerging from inside a cave surrounded by moist vegetation. The short, easily accessible route also preserves evidence of historical settlement, such as a medieval necropolis with anthropomorphic tombs carved into tufa and remains of a traditional beehive oven.

The locality forms part of the so-called Montalbán Ring of the Camino del Cid. The GR-262, PR-TE 96, BTT TE/06 Route 1, and the future Utrillas–Zaragoza Greenway also pass through the municipal area.

It has several accommodation options and a campsite on the outskirts. There is also a nursing home.

=== Religious architecture ===
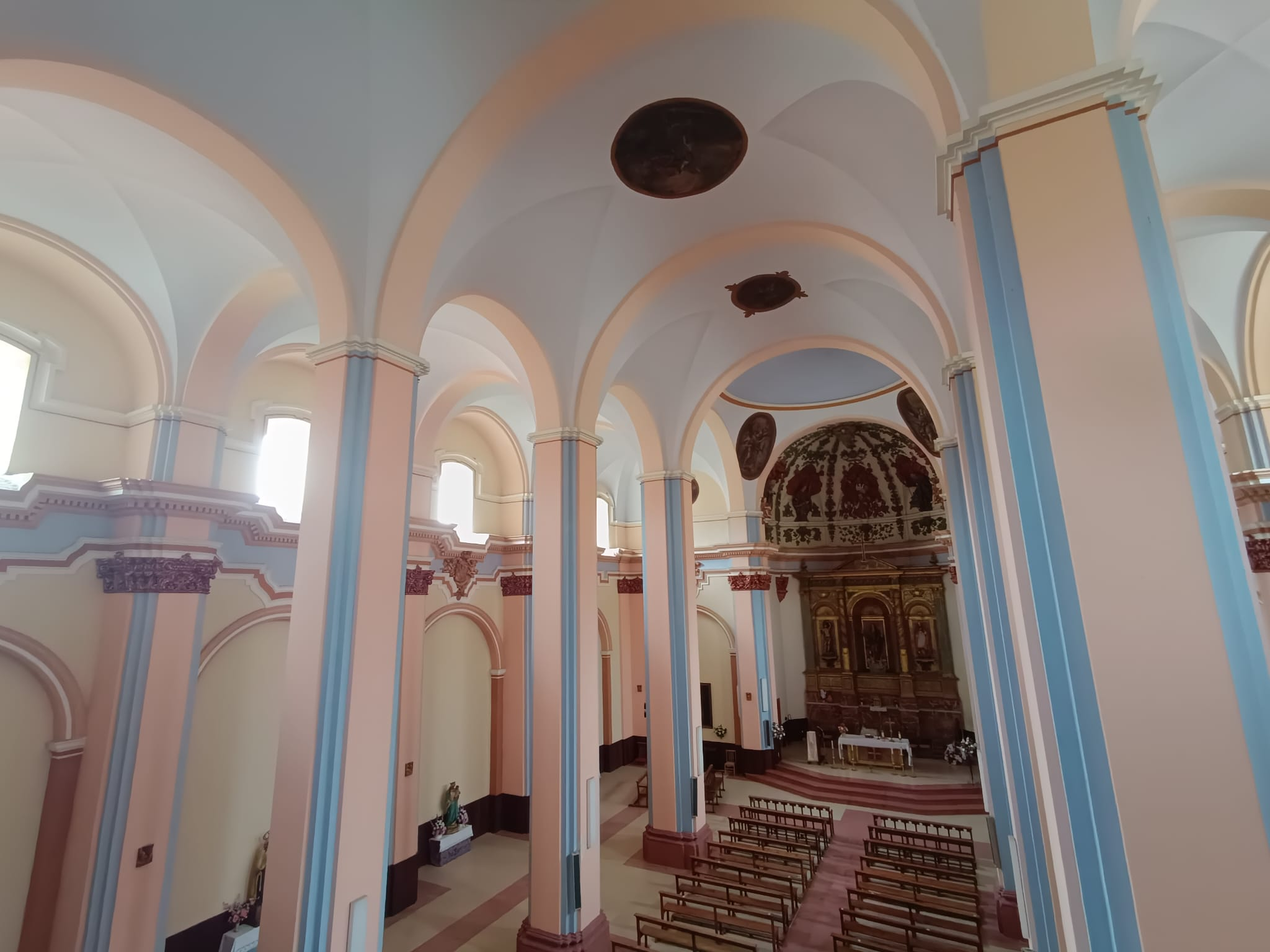
Interior of the church of Martín del Río

- Church of the Assumption of Our Lady: one of the main architectural landmarks of the municipality. It was built in the first half of the 18th century by master masons Mateo Colás and Juan José Nadal, (great-great-grandfather of the renowned architect Rafael Guastavino) following a Baroque style with a basilica plan. During the Spanish Civil War it suffered severe damage, and in the 1950s its dome collapsed, forcing its closure. Restoration works began in the late 1970s, followed by interior improvements in the following decade with active participation from local residents. Today, the church stands as a symbol of local historical and cultural heritage, bearing witness to the community's efforts to preserve its legacy.

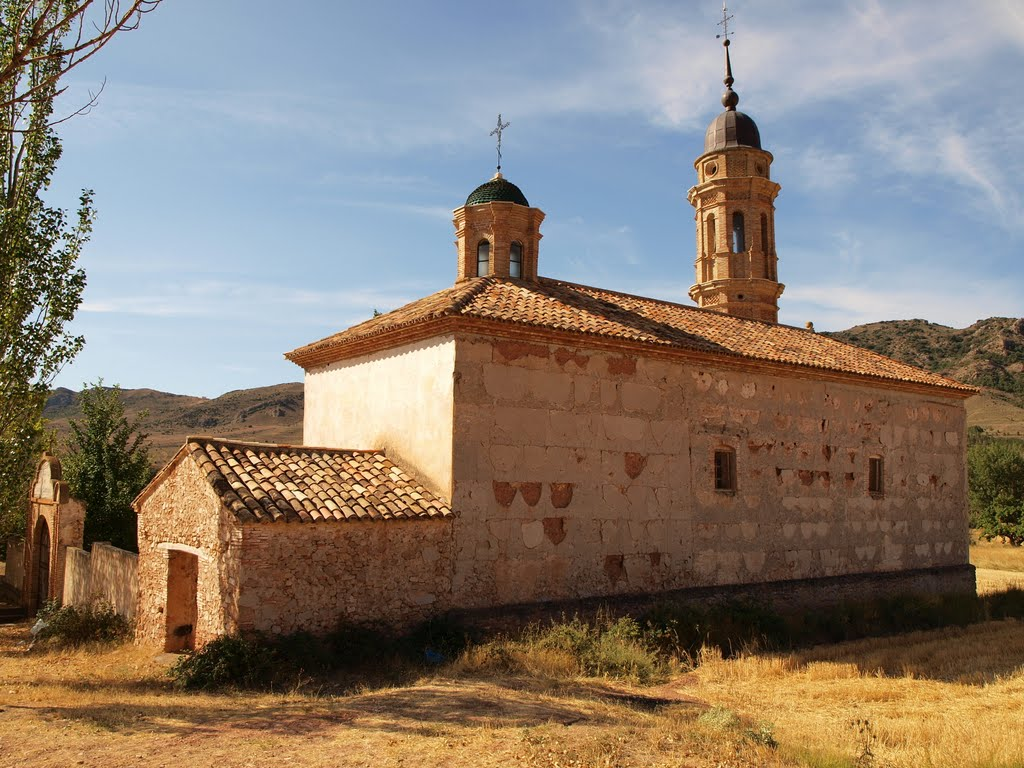
Hermitage of the Saints (Martín del Río)

- Hermitage of Saints Fabian and Sebastian: popularly known as the Hermitage of the Saints, it is located beside the N-211 road between Montalbán and Martín del Río. Built in 1522 in Baroque style, it preserves Rococo-style paintings inside. Its most notable feature is the tower, composed of three octagonal brick tiers topped by a copper spire, considered one of the finest examples of late Mudéjar in the province of Teruel. The hermitage hosts the pilgrimages of Saint Isidore and Saint George, attended by residents of the municipality and neighbouring localities.

== Festivals ==
- The festivities in honour of Our Lady of the Assumption, held in August and organised by the Festival Committee, are the main celebrations of Martín del Río. Various activities take place during these days, including musical performances, bull-related events and other popular entertainments. Traditionally, at the end of each day, the "Dance of the Fox" (baile de la zorra) was held, a characteristic local dance combining a festive spirit with a certain degree of risk.
- The Reyes festivities, held during the first week of January, are organised by the local age cohorts (Quintas y Quintos). Among the most notable events is the traditional Cavalcade of Magi, considered one of the most authentic in the province.
- The festival in honour of Saints Fabian and Sebastian, the local patrons, is usually celebrated on the Saturday closest to 20 January. The day begins with local musicians touring the houses to collect products which, after the lighting of a large evening bonfire, are auctioned at the traditional Auction of Saints Fabian and Sebastian, revived in 2018. The bonfire also serves as a community meeting point and allows dinner to be prepared over the embers. The Festival Committee is responsible for organising the celebrations.

== See also ==
- List of municipalities in Teruel
- Cuencas Mineras

== Bibliography ==
- Biescas, José Antonio (1985). El proceso de industrialización en la región aragonesa en el período 1900–1920 (in Spanish). Zaragoza: Institución «Fernando el Católico».
- Madoz, Pascual (1848). "Martin del Rio". Diccionario geográfico-estadístico-histórico de España y sus posesiones de Ultramar (in Spanish). Vol. XIII. Madrid.
