= Cucalón =

Cucalón can refer to:

- Cucalón, Spain
- Sierra de Cucalón mountain range
- Cucalón (comic strip)
