= Cuencas Mineras =

Coordinates: 40°50′N 0°48′W

- Comarca
- Country: Spain
- Autonomous community: Aragon
- Province: Teruel

Area
  - Total: 1,407.6 km^{2} (543.5 sq mi)

Population
  - Total: 9,386
  - Density: 6.668/km^{2} (17.27/sq mi)
- Time zone: UTC+1 (CET)
  - Summer (DST): UTC+2 (CEST)
- Largest municipality: Utrillas

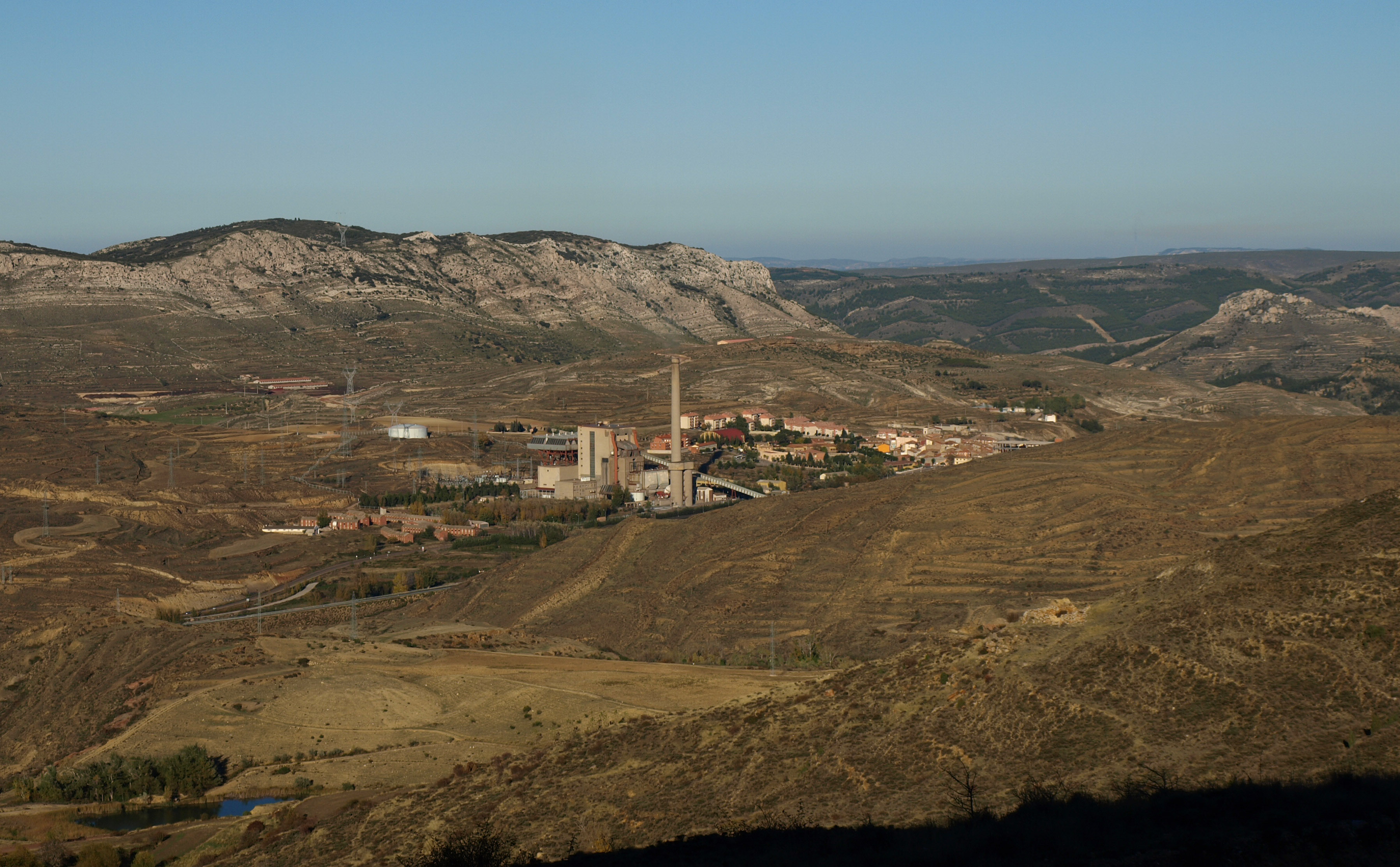
View of Escucha in Cuencas Mineras

Cuencas Mineras is a comarca in Aragon, Spain. It is located in Teruel Province, in the mountainous area of the Sistema Ibérico. The administrative capital is Utrillas, with 3,346 inhabitants the largest town of the comarca, but the historical and cultural center is Montalbán.

This comarca owes its name to certain mining zones in its area. Some municipalities of Cuencas Mineras are part of the historical region of Lower Aragon. The main mountain range in the area is Sierra de San Just.

== Municipalities ==
- Alcaine
- Aliaga
- Anadón
- Blesa
- Cañizar del Olivar
- Castel de Cabra
- Cortes de Aragón
- Cuevas de Almudén
- Escucha
- Fuenferrada
- Hinojosa de Jarque
- La Hoz de la Vieja
- Huesa del Común
- Jarque de la Val
- Josa
- Maicas
- Martín del Río
- Mezquita de Jarque
- Montalbán
- Muniesa
- Obón
- Palomar de Arroyos
- Plou
- Salcedillo
- Segura de los Baños
- Torre de las Arcas
- Utrillas
- Villanueva del Rebollar de la Sierra
- Vivel del Río Martín
- La Zoma

== See also ==
- Lower Aragon
