= Fonfría =

Fonfría may refer to the following places in Spain:

- Fonfría, Teruel
- Fonfría, Zamora
- Fonfría (A Fonsagrada), A Fonsagrada
