= Villanueva del Rebollar de la Sierra =

- municipality
- Location within Spain
- Coordinates: 40°53′N 1°0′W
- Country: Spain
- Autonomous community: Aragon
- Province: Teruel

Area
  - Total: 18.99 km^{2} (7.33 sq mi)
- Elevation: 1,085 m (3,560 ft)

Population (2025-01-01)
  - Total: 49
  - Density: 2.6/km^{2} (6.7/sq mi)
- Time zone: UTC+1 (CET)
  - Summer (DST): UTC+2 (CEST)

Villanueva del Rebollar de la Sierra is a municipality located in the province of Teruel, Aragon, Spain. According to the 2004 census (INE), the municipality has a population of 51 inhabitants.

It is located in the Sierra de Cucalón area.

== See also ==
- Cuencas Mineras
- List of municipalities in Teruel
