= Bea, Aragon =

Bea
- Location within Spain
- Coordinates: 41°2′N 1°9′W
- Country: Spain
- Autonomous community: Aragon
- Province: Teruel
- Comarca: Jiloca Comarca

Area
  - Total: 23.6 km^{2} (9.1 sq mi)
- Elevation: 1,134 m (3,720 ft)

Population (2025-01-01)
  - Total: 30
- Time zone: UTC+1 (CET)
  - Summer (DST): UTC+2 (CEST)

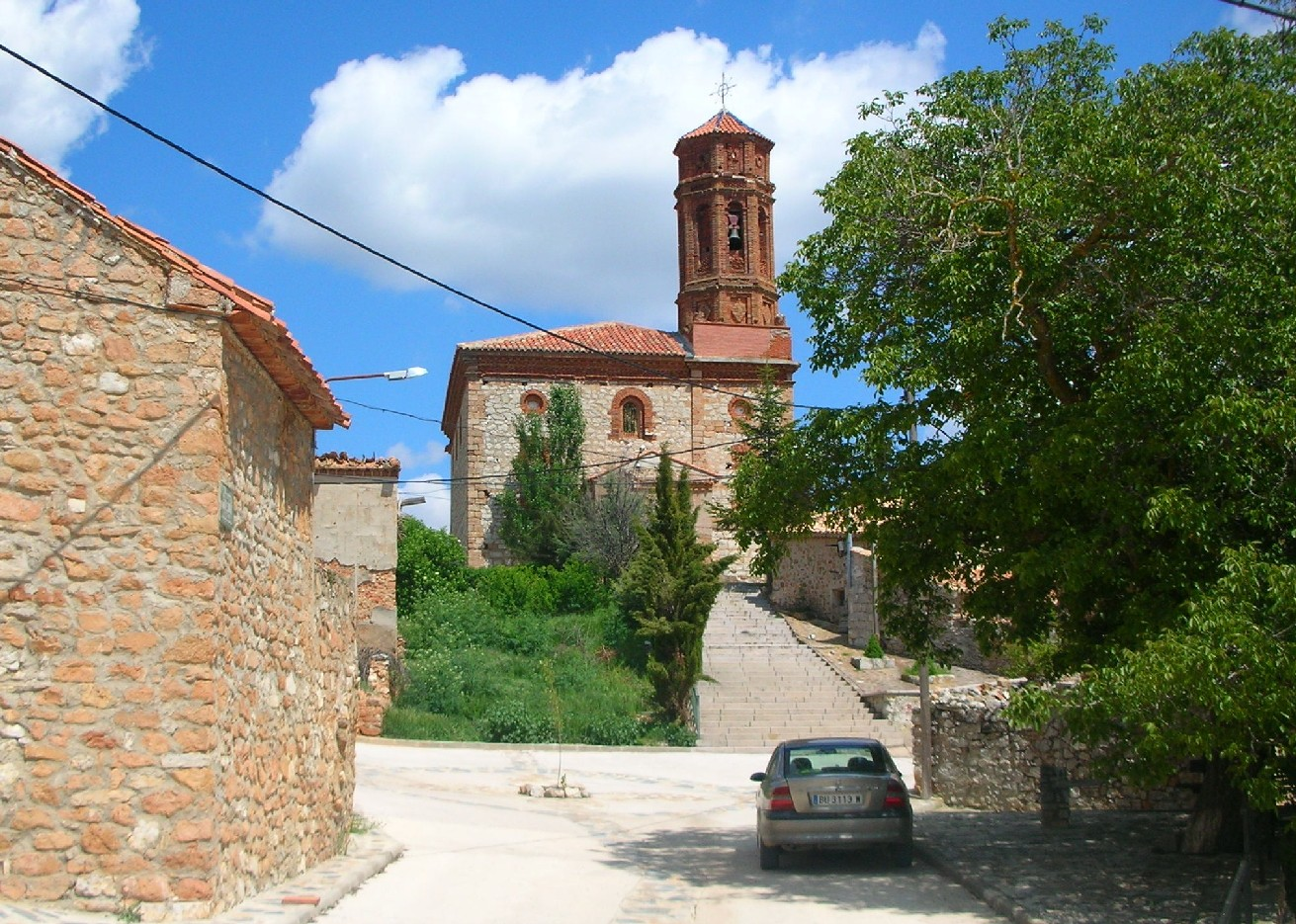
Main church in Bea

Bea is a municipality located in the Jiloca Comarca, province of Teruel, Aragon, Spain. According to the 2010 census, the municipality has a population of 38 inhabitants.

Bea is located in the Sierra de Cucalón area.

== History ==
Bea has historically been linked to agriculture and livestock farming, typical of the Jiloca valley and the Sierra de Cucalón region. The municipality preserves traces of traditional Aragonese rural life, with stone houses and narrow streets reflecting its medieval origins.

== Heritage ==
The main monument of Bea is the Iglesia Parroquial de San Bartolomé, a parish church built in the Baroque style during the 17th century. It contains several altarpieces and artistic works from the period. The municipality also features traditional fountains and washhouses, which historically important for daily life.

== Demography ==
Like many small municipalities in Teruel, Bea has experienced significant depopulation throughout the 20th and 21st centuries, declining from several hundred inhabitants at the beginning of the century to fewer than 20 residents today.

== See also ==
- Jiloca Comarca
- List of municipalities in Teruel
