= Maicas =

- municipality
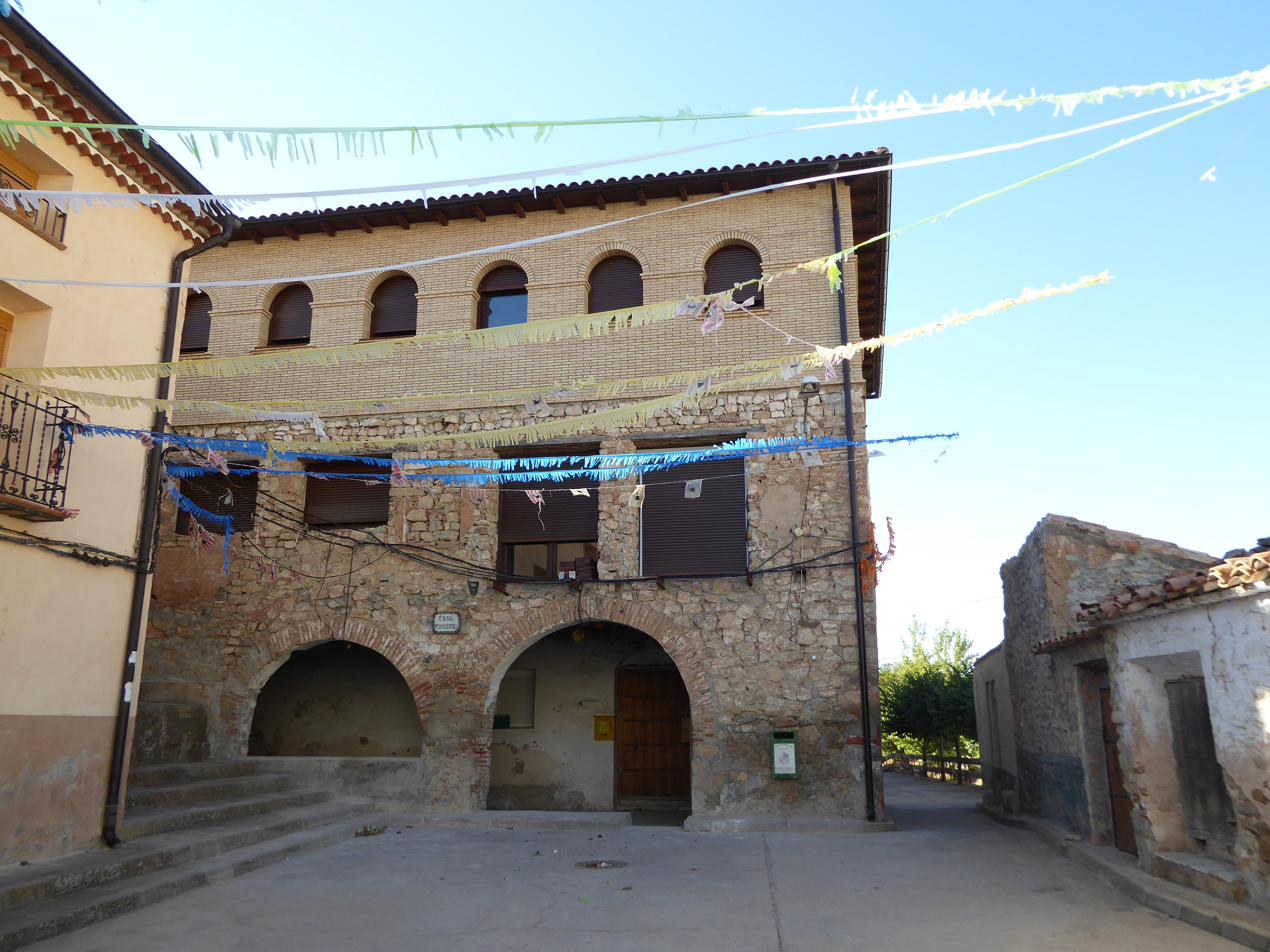
- Town hall

- Flag Coat of arms

- Location within Spain
- Coordinates: 40°58′N 0°53′W
- Country: Spain
- Autonomous community: Aragon
- Province: Teruel

Area
  - Total: 24 km^{2} (9.3 sq mi)

Population (2025-01-01)
  - Total: 35
  - Density: 1.5/km^{2} (3.8/sq mi)
- Time zone: UTC+1 (CET)
  - Summer (DST): UTC+2 (CEST)

Maicas is a municipality located in the province of Teruel, Aragon, Spain. According to the 2004 census (INE), the municipality has a population of 39 inhabitants.

It is located in the Sierra de Cucalón area.

== See also ==
- Cuencas Mineras
- List of municipalities in Teruel
