= La Hoz de la Vieja =

- municipality
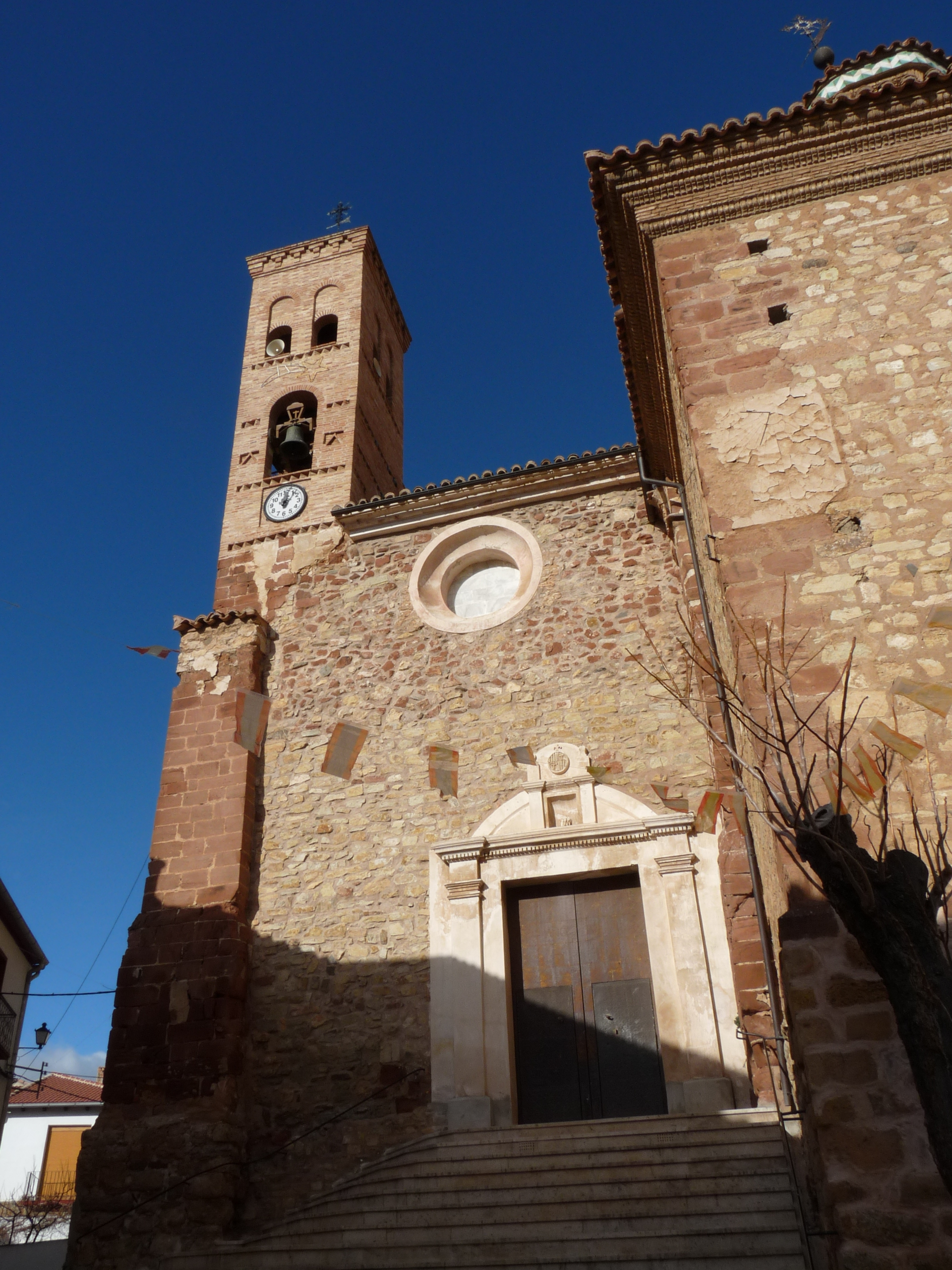

- Flag Coat of arms

- Location within Spain
- Coordinates: 40°55′N 0°50′W
- Country: Spain
- Autonomous community: Aragon
- Province: Teruel
- Municipality: La Hoz de la Vieja

Area
  - Total: 43 km^{2} (17 sq mi)
- Elevation: 932 m (3,058 ft)

Population (2025-01-01)
  - Total: 85
  - Density: 2.0/km^{2} (5.1/sq mi)
- Time zone: UTC+1 (CET)
  - Summer (DST): UTC+2 (CEST)

La Hoz de la Vieja is a municipality located in the province of Teruel, Aragon, Spain. According to the 2004 census (INE), the municipality has a population of 108 inhabitants.

It is located at the eastern end of the Sierra de Cucalón area.

== See also ==
- Cuencas Mineras
- List of municipalities in Teruel
