= Escucha =

Escucha can refer to:

- The town of Escucha in Spain
- Escucha, the Spanish equivalent of Laura Pausini album Resta in ascolto
