= Plou, Aragon =

Plou
- Municipality
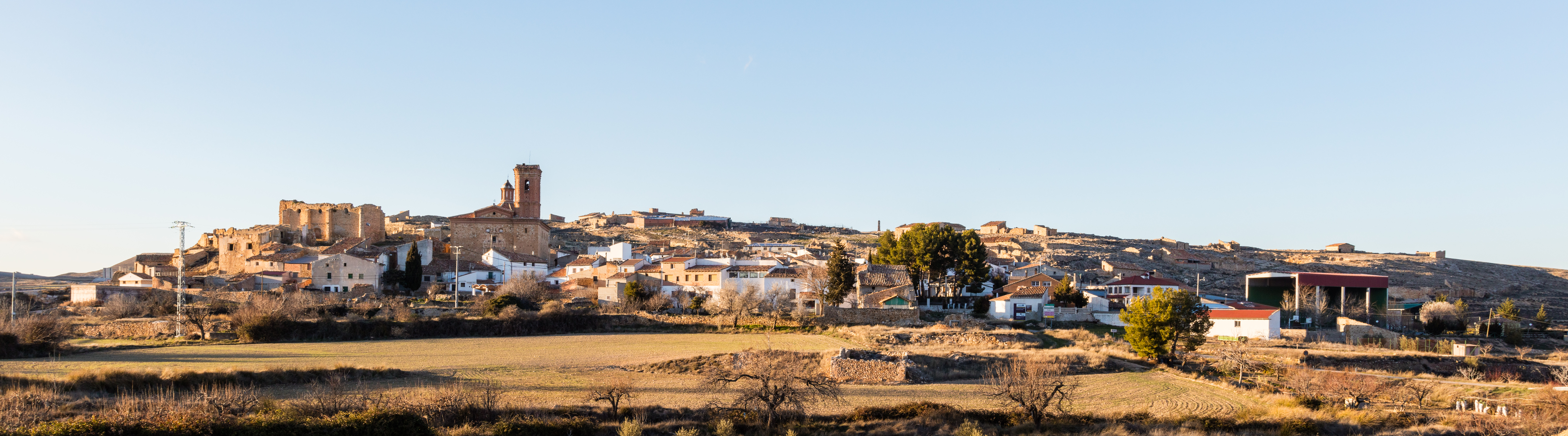

- Flag Coat of arms

- Location within Spain
- Coordinates: 40.992°N 0.853°W
- Country: Spain
- Autonomous community: Aragon
- Province: Teruel

Area
  - Total: 17.33 km^{2} (6.69 sq mi)

Population (2025-01-01)
  - Total: 42
- Time zone: UTC+1 (CET)
  - Summer (DST): UTC+2 (CEST)

Plou is a municipality located in the Province of Teruel, Aragon, Spain. According to the 2004 census (INE), the municipality has a population of 49 inhabitants.

The extinct plant genus Ploufolia was discovered in and named after the municipality.

Plou is also a common surname in the small community.

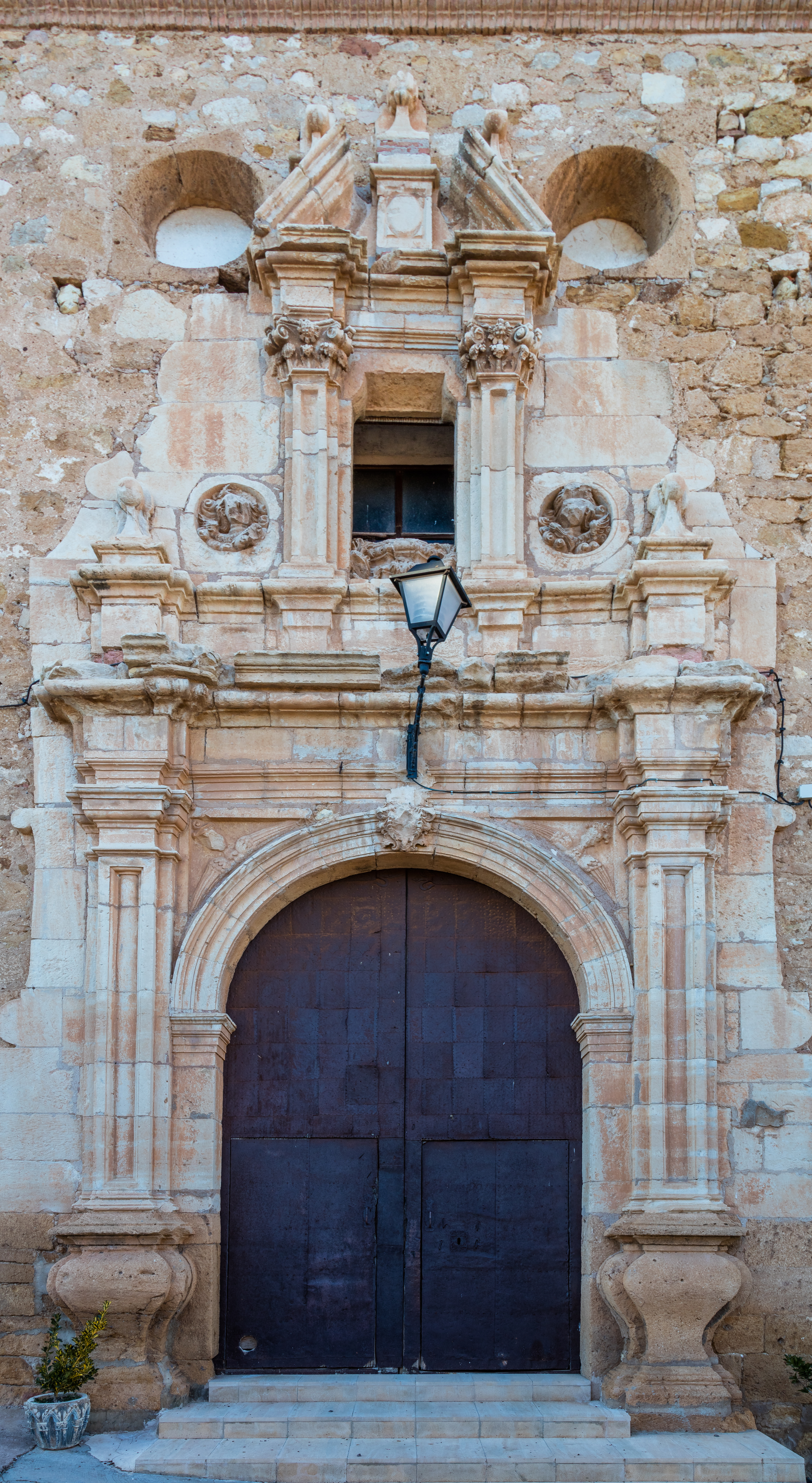
Church of Santa Cruz, Plou

As of 2021, the town had 50 registered residents but only 24 year-round residents, including two school age children who travel to Montalbán for school. The town declined in the 1960s with the closing a mining railway from Utrillas to Zaragoza, and more emigration to larger cities, mainly Zaragoza and Barcelona.

== See also ==
- List of municipalities in Teruel
