= Salcedillo =

- municipality
- Location within Spain
- Coordinates: 40°58′N 1°0′W
- Country: Spain
- Autonomous community: Aragon
- Province: Teruel
- Comarca: Cuencas Mineras

Area
  - Total: 16.89 km^{2} (6.52 sq mi)
- Elevation: 1,195 m (3,921 ft)

Population (2025-01-01)
  - Total: 14
  - Density: 0.83/km^{2} (2.1/sq mi)
- Time zone: UTC+1 (CET)
  - Summer (DST): UTC+2 (CEST)

Salcedillo is a municipality located in the Cuencas Mineras comarca, province of Teruel, Aragon, Spain. According to the 2010 census the municipality has a population of 8 inhabitants. Its postal code is 44793.

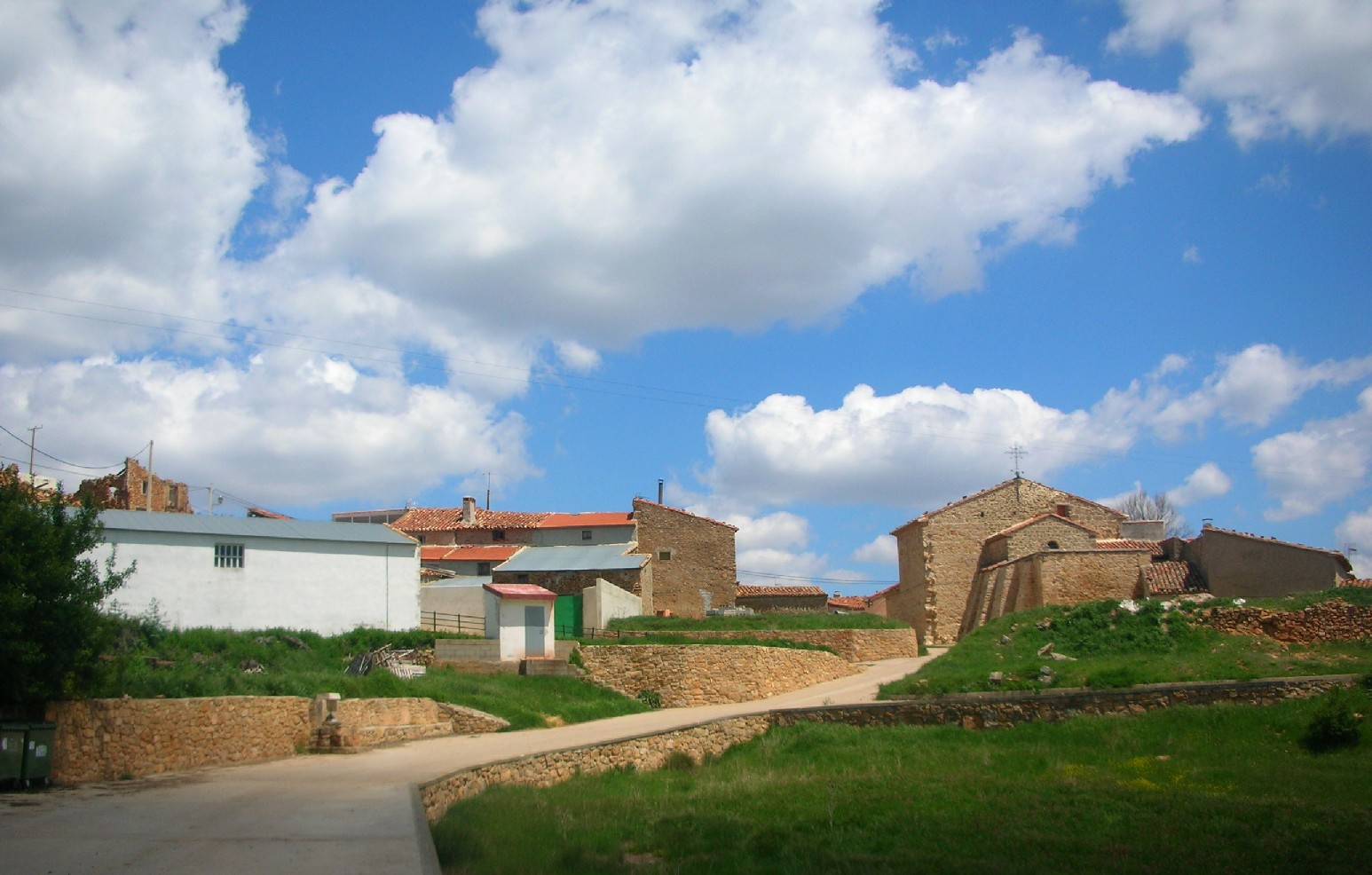
View of Salcedillo

Salcedillo is located in the Sierra de Cucalón area.

== See also ==
- Cuencas Mineras
- List of municipalities in Teruel
