= Josa =

Josa, Spain
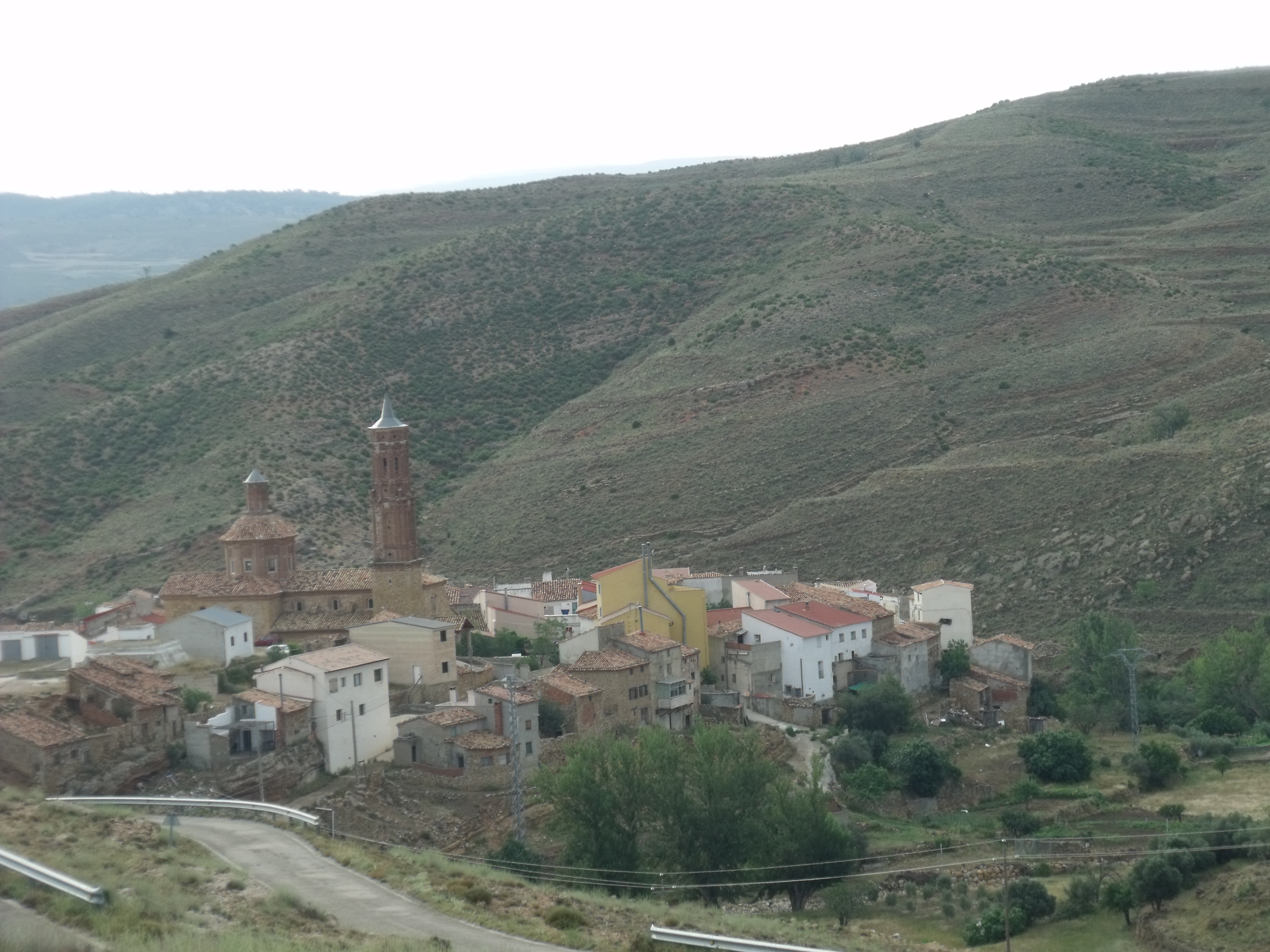

- Location within Spain
- Coordinates: 40°57′N 0°46′W
- Country: Spain
- Autonomous community: Aragon
- Province: Teruel
- Comarca: Cuencas Mineras

Area
  - Total: 28 km^{2} (11 sq mi)

Population (2025-01-01)
  - Total: 34
  - Density: 1.2/km^{2} (3.1/sq mi)
- Time zone: UTC+1 (CET)
  - Summer (DST): UTC+2 (CEST)

Josa is a municipality located in the province of Teruel, Aragon, Spain. According to the 2004 census (INE), the population had 30 inhabitants.

== See also ==
- List of municipalities in Teruel
