= Allueva =

- municipality
- Location within Spain
- Coordinates: 40°59′N 1°2′W
- Country: Spain
- Autonomous community: Aragon
- Province: Teruel
- Comarca: Jiloca Comarca

Area
  - Total: 18.65 km^{2} (7.20 sq mi)
- Elevation: 1,200 m (3,900 ft)

Population (2025-01-01)
  - Total: 31
  - Density: 1.7/km^{2} (4.3/sq mi)
- Time zone: UTC+1 (CET)
  - Summer (DST): UTC+2 (CEST)

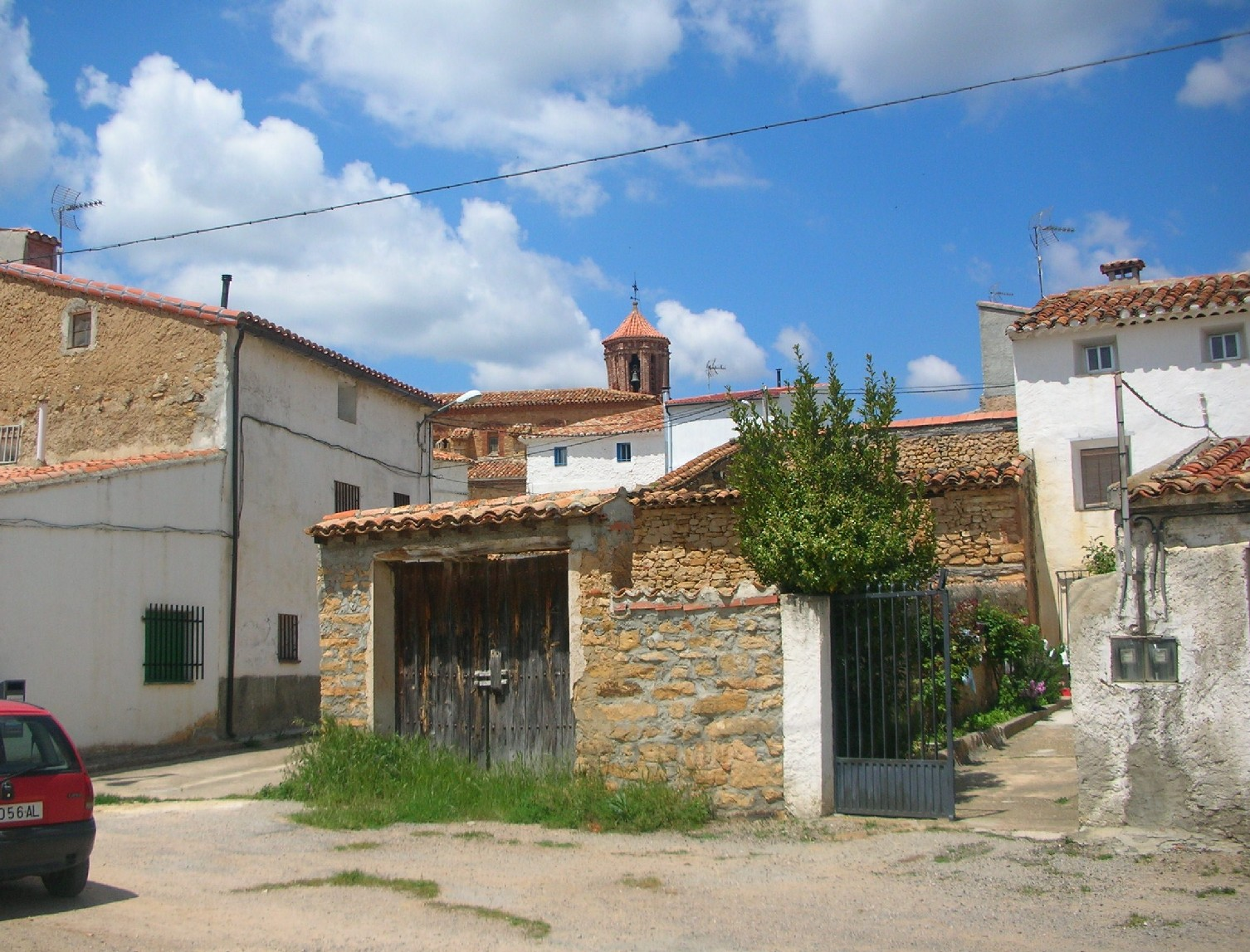
View of Allueva

Allueva is a municipality located in the Jiloca Comarca, province of Teruel, Aragon, Spain. According to the 2018 census the municipality has a population of 29 inhabitants.

It is located in the Sierra de Cucalón area. The sources of the Huerva River are close to this town.

== See also ==
- Jiloca Comarca
- List of municipalities in Teruel
