= Lanzuela =

- municipality
- Location within Spain
- Coordinates: 41°6′N 1°12′W
- Country: Spain
- Autonomous community: Aragon
- Province: Teruel
- Comarca: Jiloca

Area
  - Total: 14 km^{2} (5.4 sq mi)

Population (2025-01-01)
  - Total: 24
  - Density: 1.7/km^{2} (4.4/sq mi)
- Time zone: UTC+1 (CET)
  - Summer (DST): UTC+2 (CEST)

Lanzuela is a municipality located in the province of Teruel, Aragon, Spain. According to the 2010 census the municipality has a population of 102 inhabitants.

Lanzuela is located at the western end of the Sierra de Cucalón area. There are two shrines (ermitas) in the town, the Ermita de Jesús Nazareno and the Ermita de Santa Bárbara, built in the 18th century.

== Gallery ==
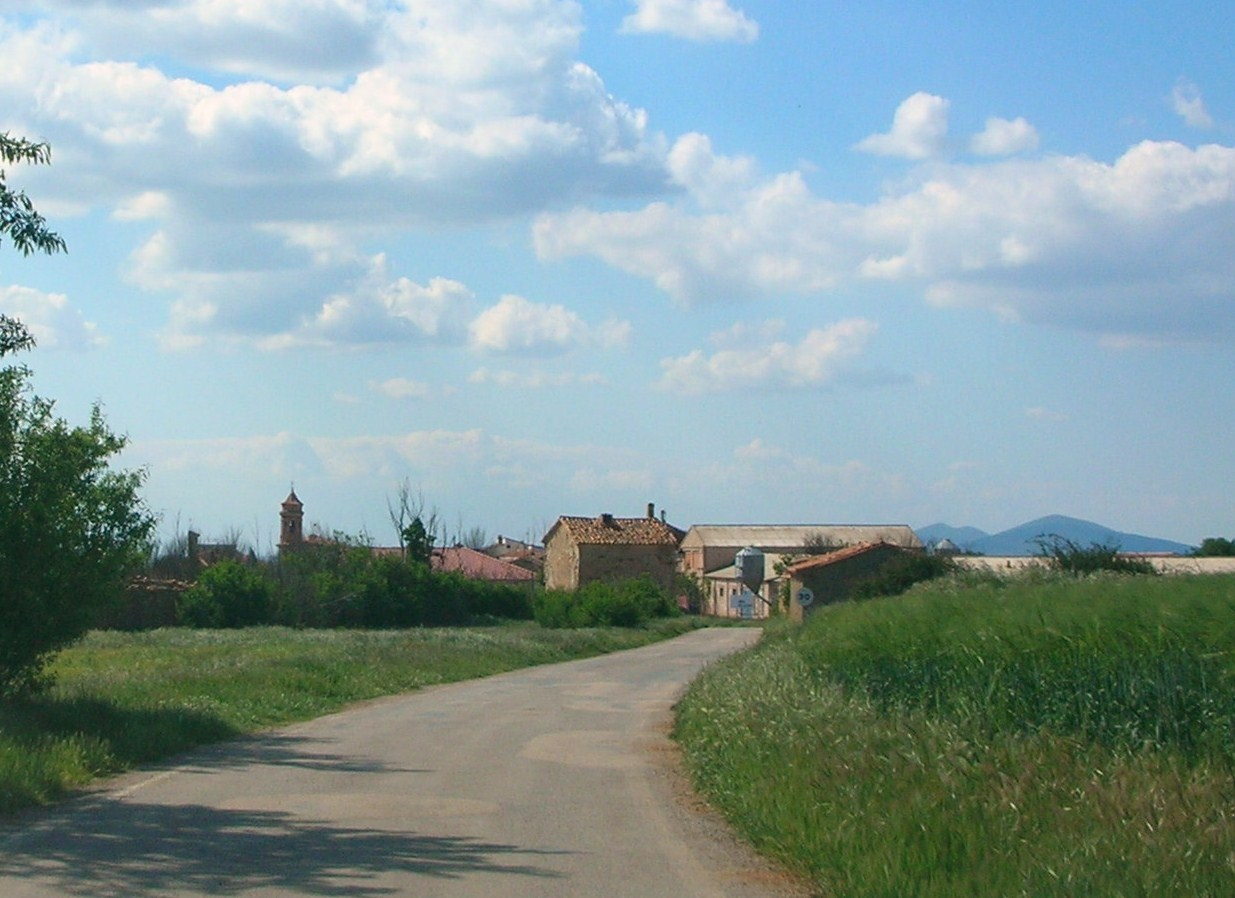
View of Lanzuela

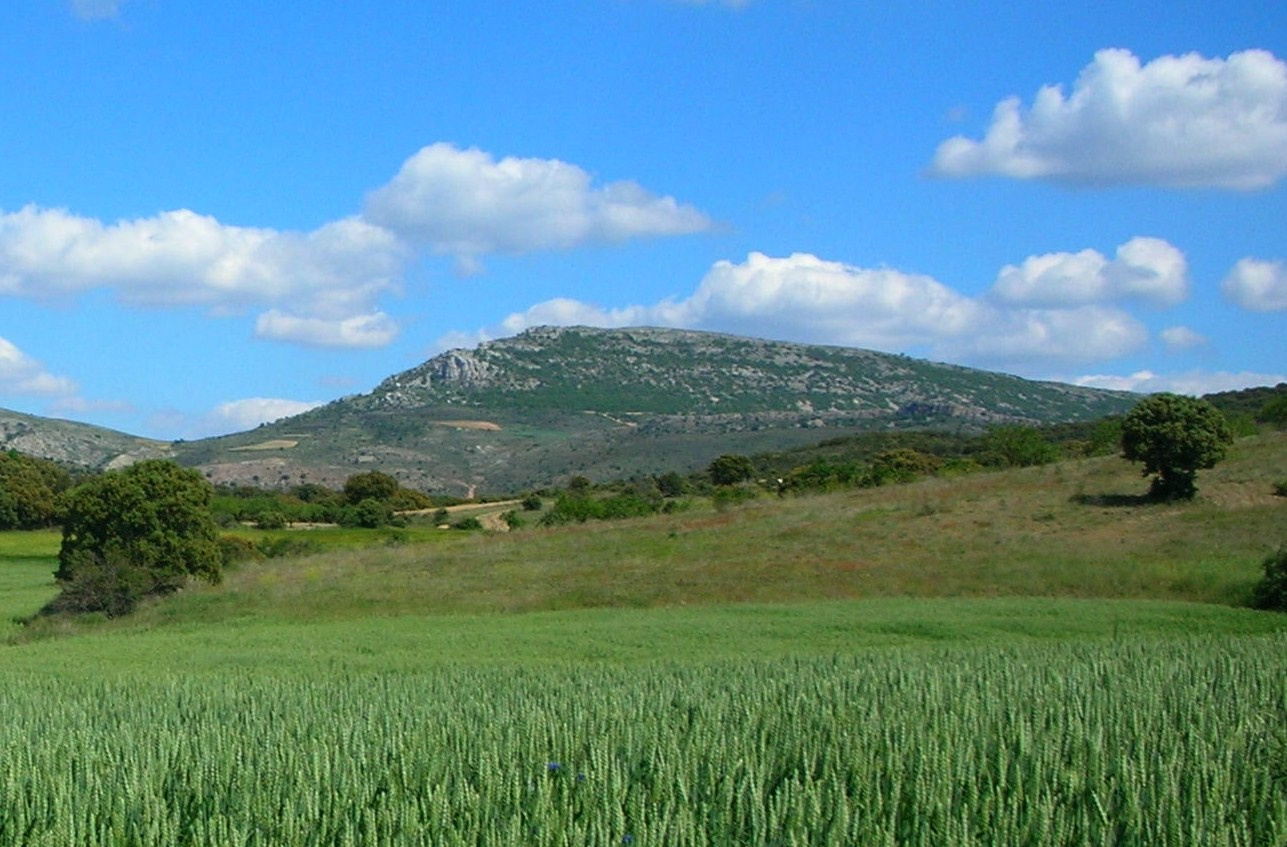
La Modorra, highest point in the Sierra de Cucalón system seen from near Lanzuela

== See also ==
- Jiloca Comarca
- List of municipalities in Teruel
