= Ploufolia =

Ploufolia Temporal range: Albian

Scientific classification
- Kingdom: Plantae
- (unranked): Angiosperms
- Class: Magnoliopsida
- Order: Nymphaeales
- Genus: Ploufolia Sender et al., 2010

Species
- Ploufolia cerciforme

Genus of plants

Ploufolia is an extinct genus of plants in the order Nymphaeales. It existed in northeastern Spain during the Upper Albian period. One specimen of a species named Ploufolia cerciforme was discovered in 2010 at the Utrillas Formation, near Plou, Teruel Province; the genus name is derived from the locality of Plou.
