= Fuenferrada =

- Municipality
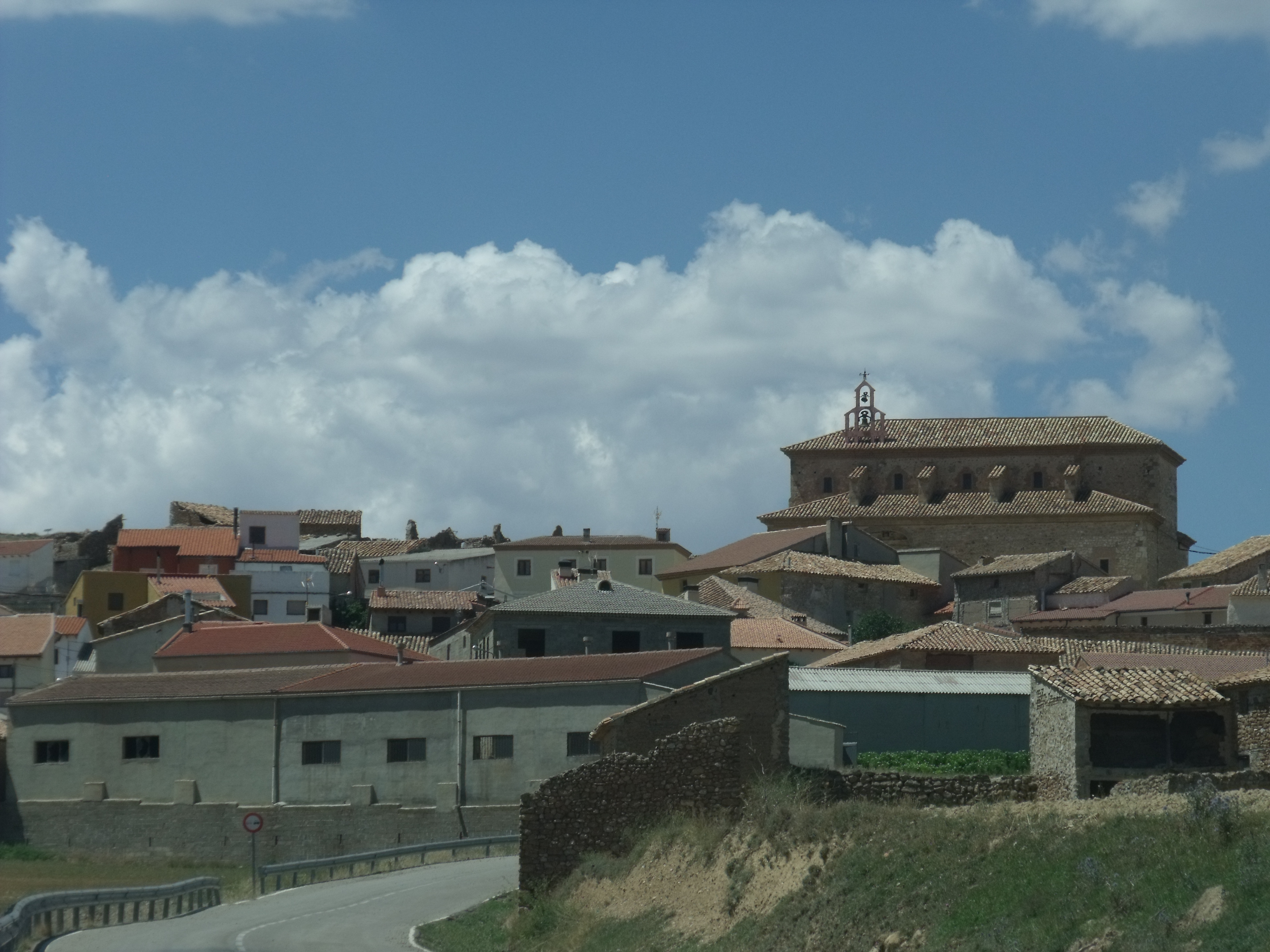

- Location in Spain
- Coordinates: 40°52′9.70″N 1°0′40.21″W
- Country: Spain
- Autonomous community: Aragón
- Province: Teruel
- Comarca: Cuencas Mineras
- Judicial district: Calamocha

Government
  - Alcalde: María Ortega Lacasa (PP)

Area
  - Total: 24.22 km^{2} (9.35 sq mi)
- Elevation: 1,128 m (3,701 ft)

Population (2025-01-01)
  - Total: 38
  - Density: 1.6/km^{2} (4.1/sq mi)
- Demonym(s): fonferrino, -a fuenferradino, -a
- Time zone: UTC+1 (CET)
  - Summer (DST): UTC+2 (CEST)
- Postal code: 44741
- Dialing code: (+34) 978 752...

Fuenferrada is a town and municipality in Aragon, located in the comarca of Cuencas Mineras, in the province of Teruel. According to the 2005 census (INE), the municipality has a population of 43 inhabitants, with an area of 24.22 km^{2} (9.35 sq mi) and a density of 1.77/km^{2} (4.6/sq mi).

The municipality is 73 kilometres (45 mi) from Teruel, the provincial capital.

== See also ==
- List of municipalities in Teruel
