= Fonfría, Teruel =

Fonfría
- Location within Spain
- Coordinates: 40°59′N 1°5′W
- Country: Spain
- Autonomous community: Aragon
- Province: Teruel
- Comarca: Jiloca

Area
  - Total: 20.35 km^{2} (7.86 sq mi)
- Elevation: 1,247 m (4,091 ft)

Population (2025-01-01)
  - Total: 35
- Time zone: UTC+1 (CET)
  - Summer (DST): UTC+2 (CEST)

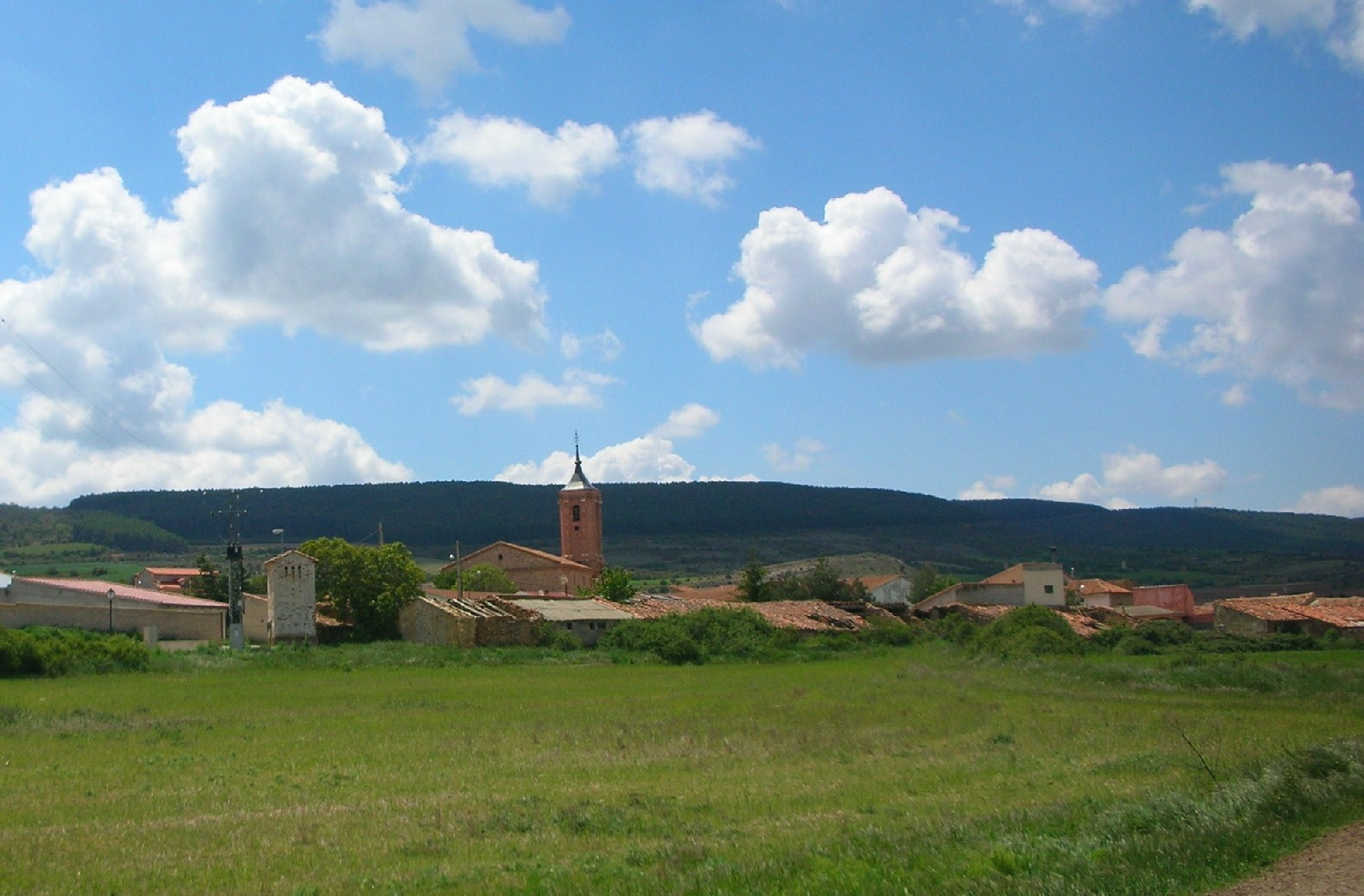
View of Fonfría with the Sierra de Cucalón in the background

Fonfría (Spanish pronunciation: [foɱ.ˈfɾi.a]) is a municipality located in the Jiloca Comarca, province of Teruel, Aragon, Spain. At the time of the 2010 census the municipality had a population of 30 inhabitants.

Fonfría is located in the Sierra de Cucalón area, close to the sources of the Huerva River.

== See also ==
- Jiloca Comarca
- List of municipalities in Teruel
