= Church of San Bartolomé (Tarazona de la Mancha) =

- Iglesia Parroquial de San Bartolomé (Spanish)
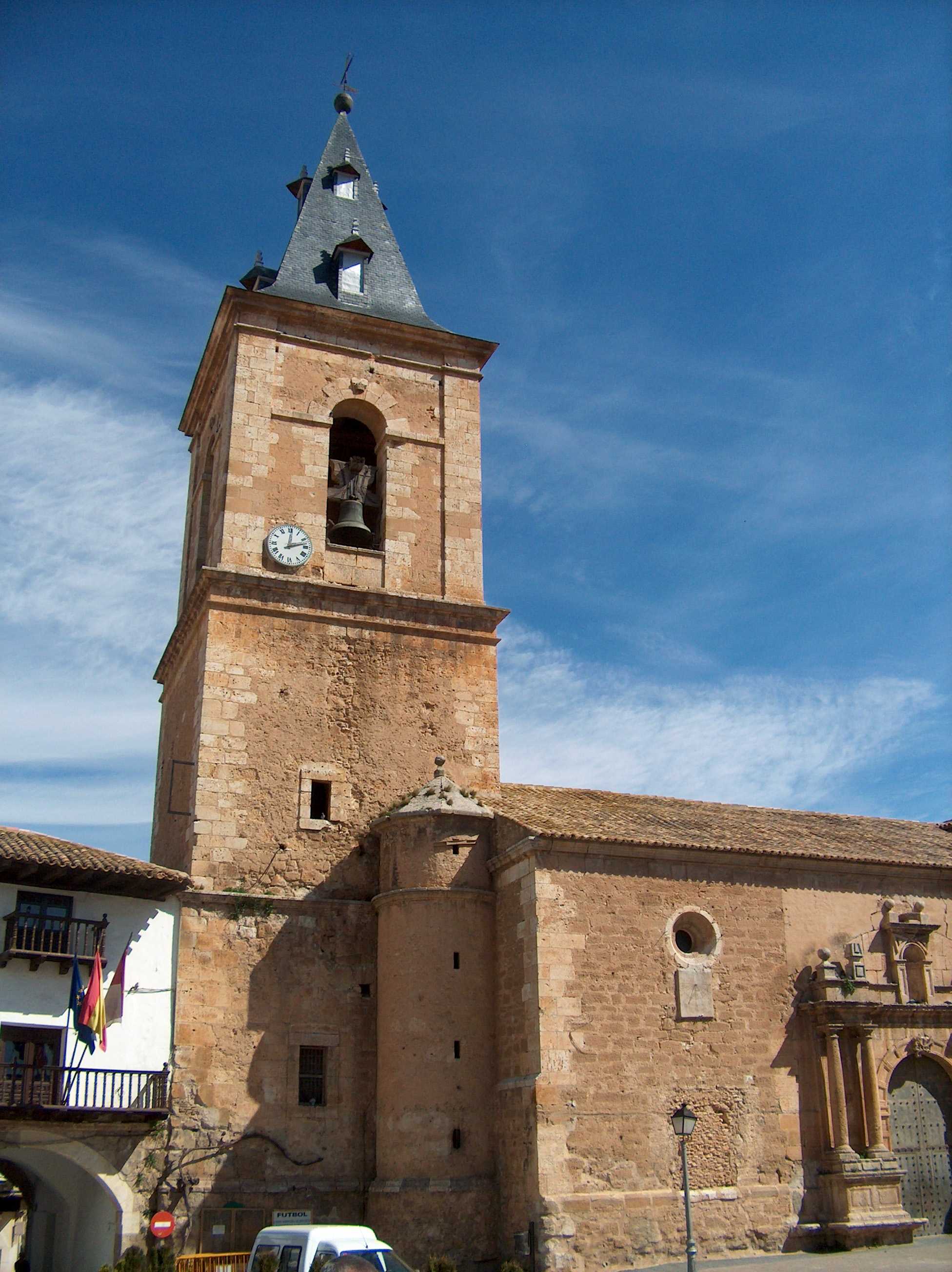

- Location within Spain
- 39.265329°N 1.912464°W
- Location: Tarazona de la Mancha, Spain

Spanish Cultural Heritage
- Official name: Iglesia Parroquial de San Bartolomé
- Type: Non-movable
- Criteria: Monument
- Designated: 1992
- Reference no.: RI-51-0007370

The Church of San Bartolomé (Spanish: Iglesia Parroquial de San Bartolomé) is a church located in Tarazona de la Mancha, Spain. It was declared Bien de Interés Cultural in 1992.

Construction began in 1549 in a Renaissance-style; the church was only completed in 1694. The main portal resembles a triumphal arch. The main altar once had a very elaborate retablo, but it succumbed to arson in 1931.
