= Vivel del Río Martín =

- Location within Spain
- Coordinates: 40°52′N 0°56′W
- Country: Spain
- Autonomous community: Aragon
- Province: Teruel
- Comarca: Cuencas Mineras

Area
  - Total: 51.16 km^{2} (19.75 sq mi)
- Elevation: 970 m (3,180 ft)

Population (2025-01-01)
  - Total: 63
  - Density: 1.2/km^{2} (3.2/sq mi)
- Time zone: UTC+1 (CET)
  - Summer (DST): UTC+2 (CEST)

Vivel del Río Martín is a municipality located in Cuencas Mineras, Teruel Province, Aragon, Spain. According to the 2004 census (INE), the municipality had a population of 84 inhabitants.

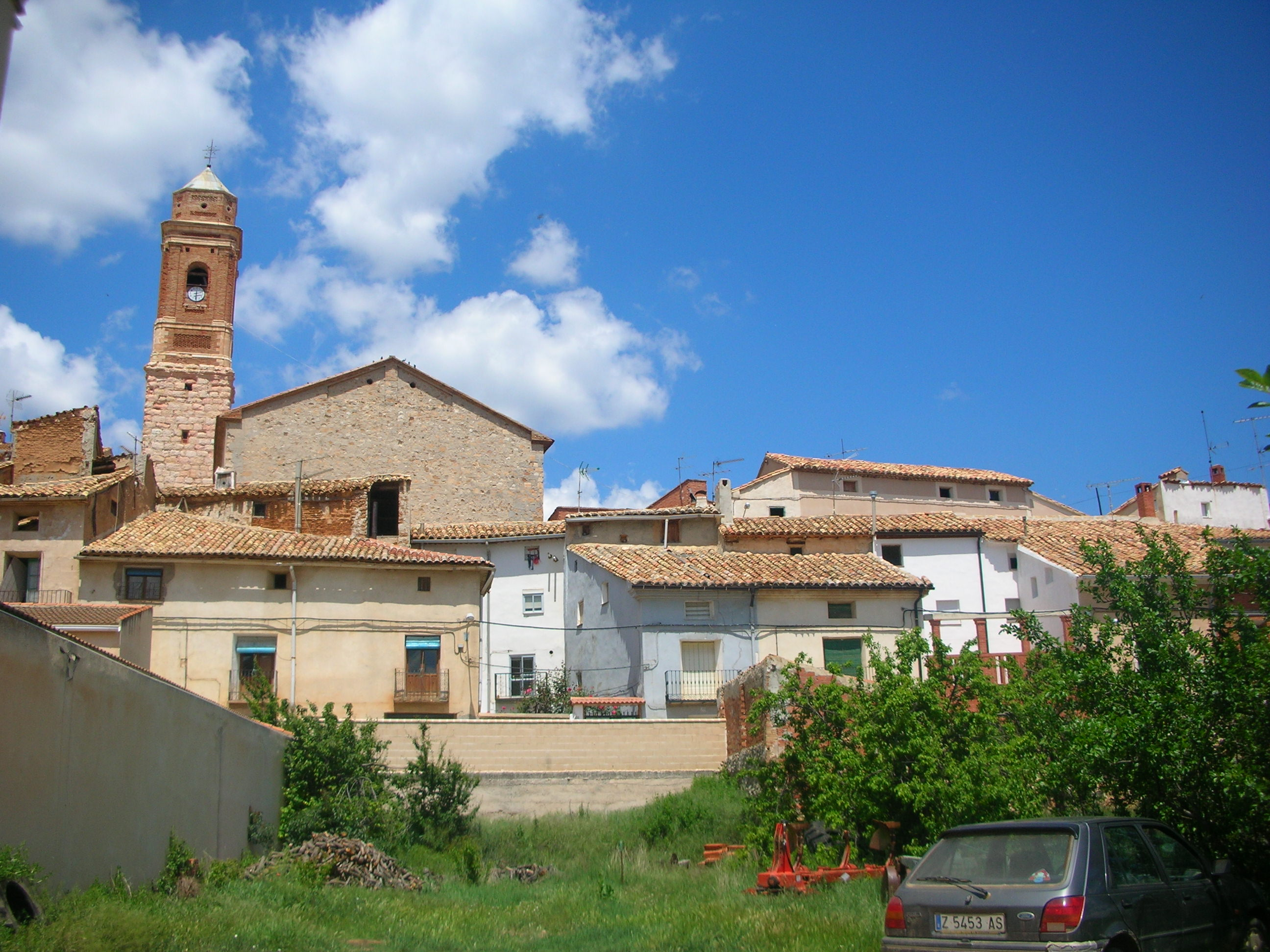
View of Vivel town

== See also ==
- List of municipalities in Teruel
