= Segura de los Baños =

- Coat of arms

- Location within Spain
- Coordinates: 40°56′N 0°57′W
- Country: Spain
- Autonomous community: Aragon
- Province: Teruel
- Comarca: Cuencas Mineras

Area
  - Total: 54.15 km^{2} (20.91 sq mi)
- Elevation: 1,122 m (3,681 ft)

Population (2025-01-01)
  - Total: 55
  - Density: 1.0/km^{2} (2.6/sq mi)
- Time zone: UTC+1 (CET)
  - Summer (DST): UTC+2 (CEST)

Segura de los Baños is a municipality and ancient spa town located in the Cuencas Mineras comarca, province of Teruel, Aragon, Spain. According to the 2010 census the municipality has a population of 40 inhabitants. Its postal code is 44793.

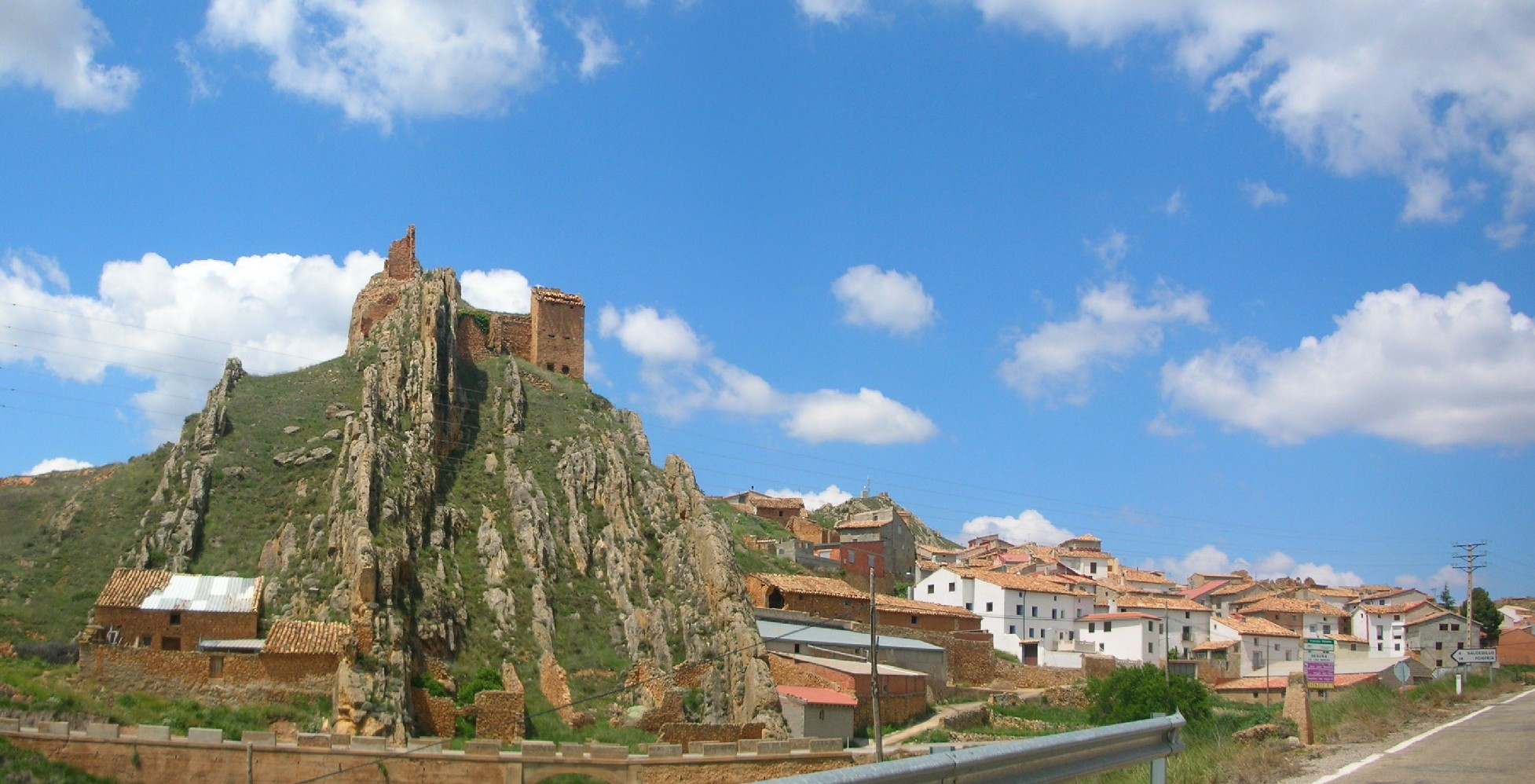
View of Segura de los Baños with one of the two rocky outcrops that rise beside the town

== See also ==
- Cuencas Mineras
- List of municipalities in Teruel
