= Cucalón, Aragon =

Cucalón
- Flag Coat of arms

- Location within Spain
- Coordinates: 41°5′N 1°13′W
- Country: Spain
- Autonomous community: Aragon
- Province: Teruel
- Comarca: Jiloca

Area
  - Total: 31.87 km^{2} (12.31 sq mi)
- Elevation: 1,036 m (3,399 ft)

Population (2025-01-01)
  - Total: 77
- Time zone: UTC+1 (CET)
  - Summer (DST): UTC+2 (CEST)

Cucalón is a municipality located in the province of Teruel, Aragon, Spain. According to the 2010 census the municipality has a population of 102 inhabitants. This town gives its name to the Sierra de Cucalón system of mountain ranges.

There are ruins of an ancient Iberian settlement, known as Peña el Castillo, located within Cucalón's municipal term.

== Gallery ==
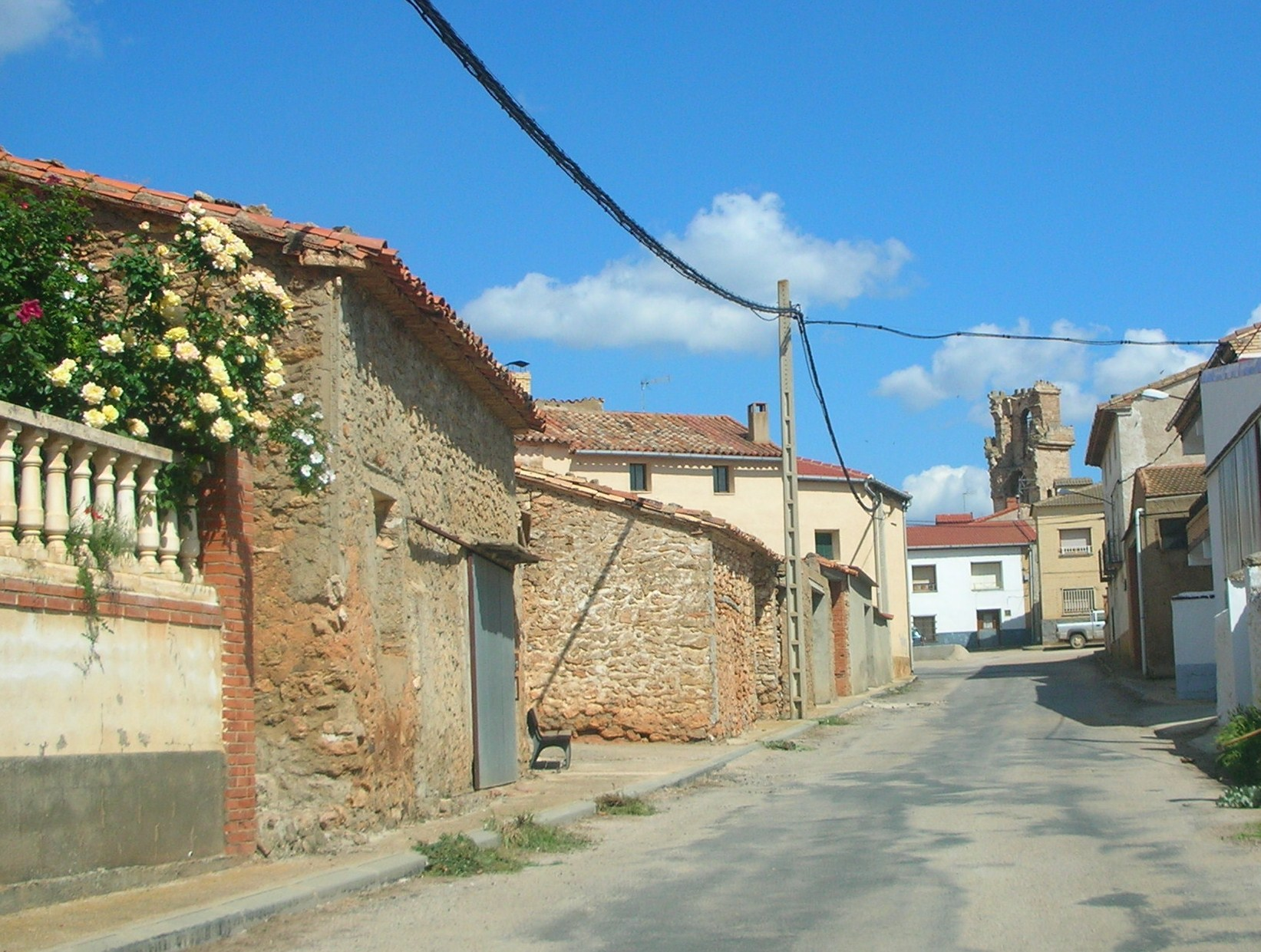
Street in Cucalón with the remains of Santiago church

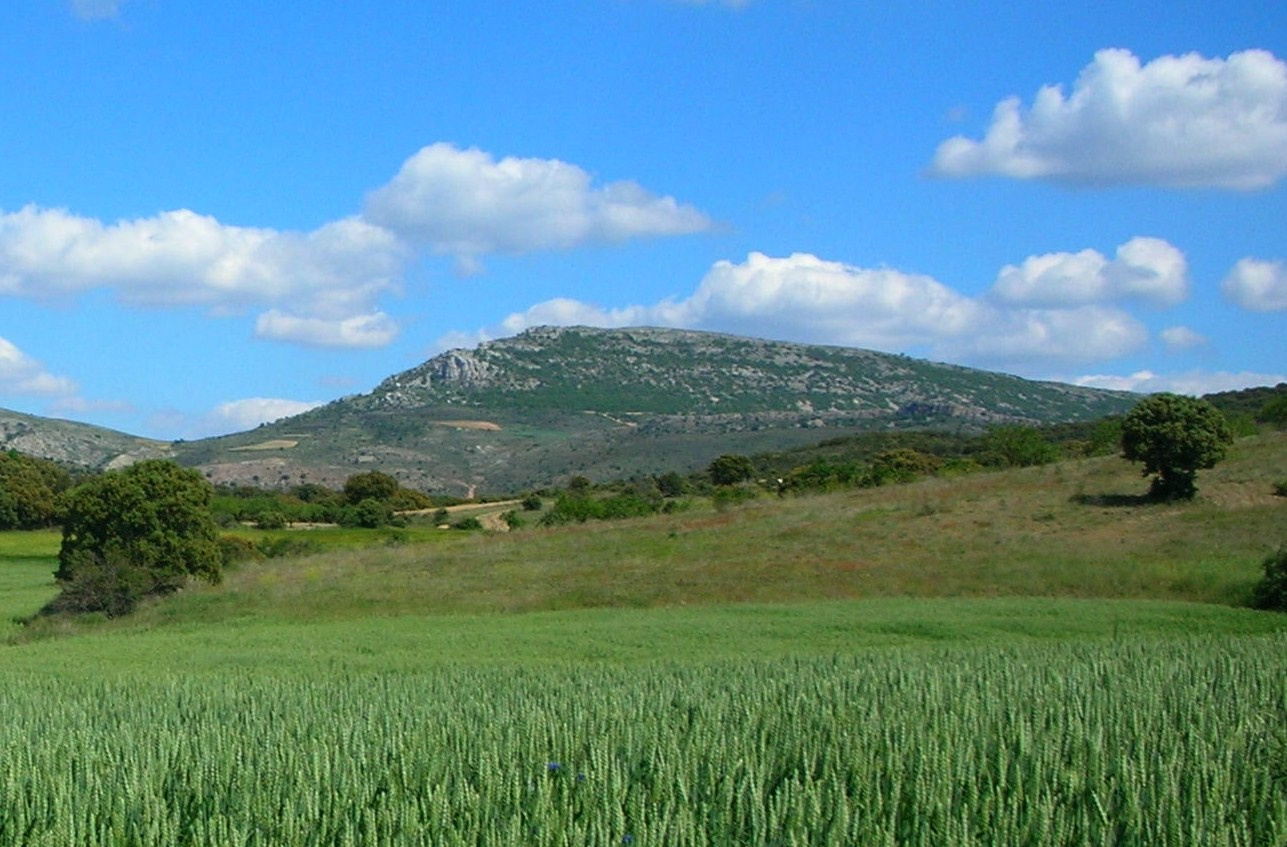
La Modorra, highest point in the Sierra de Cucalón system

== See also ==
- Jiloca Comarca
- List of municipalities in Teruel
