= Montalbán, Teruel =

Montalbán, Spain
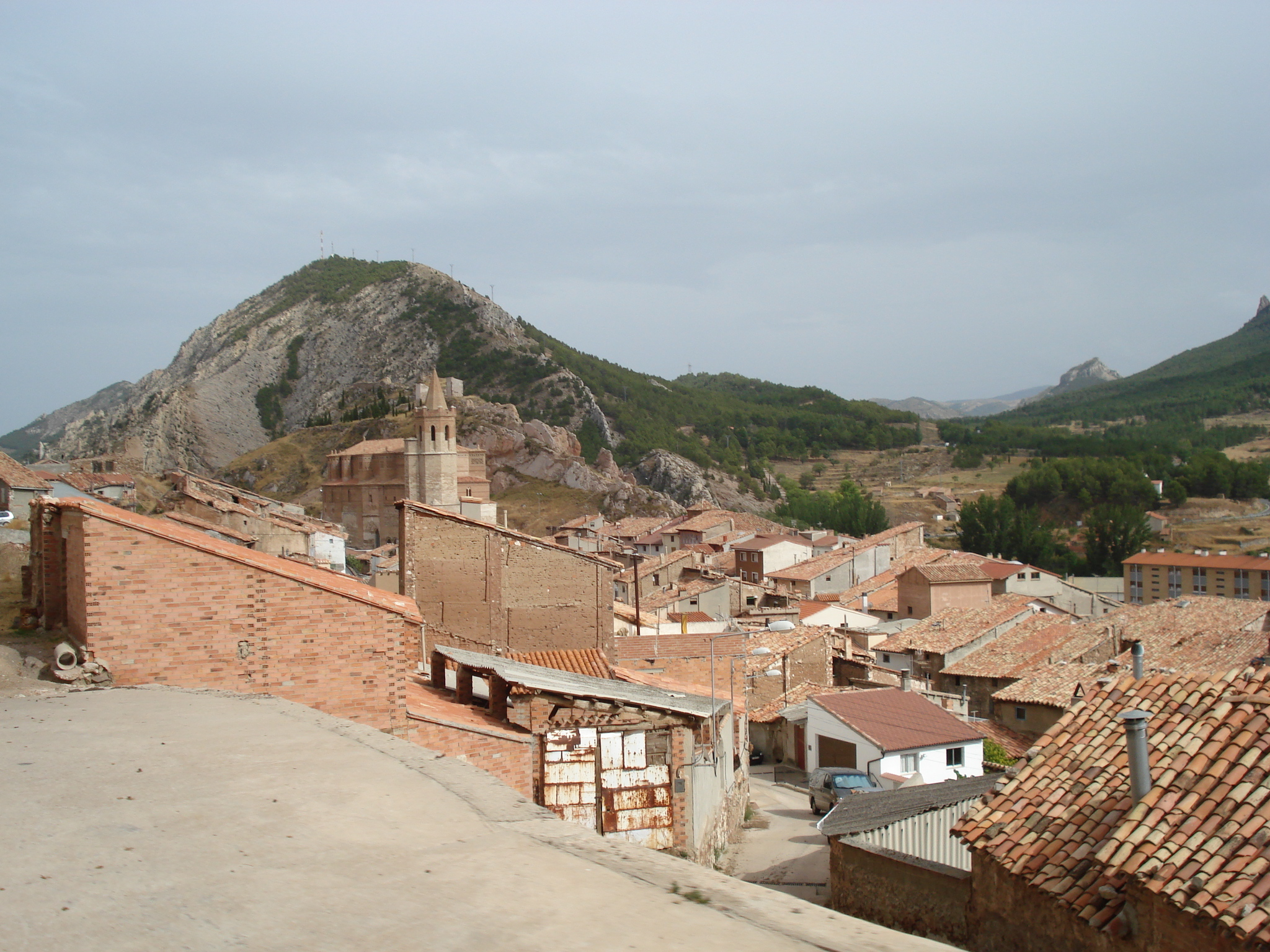

- Coat of arms

- Location within Spain
- Coordinates: 40°50′N 0°48′W
- Country: Spain
- Autonomous community: Aragon
- Province: Teruel
- Municipality: Montalbán

Area
  - Total: 82 km^{2} (32 sq mi)
- Elevation: 907 m (2,976 ft)

Population (2025-01-01)
  - Total: 1,162
- Time zone: UTC+1 (CET)
  - Summer (DST): UTC+2 (CEST)

Montalbán is a town and municipality in Spain with a population of 1,538, an area of 82 km^{2} and a density of 18.75, located in Teruel province, in the autonomous community of Aragón. It is the historical and cultural capital of the Cuencas Mineras Aragonese comarca.

The Sierra de San Just rises south of the town. Road N-211 crosses the southern end of Montalbán.

== See also ==
- List of municipalities in Teruel
