= Escucha, Teruel =

Escucha, Spain
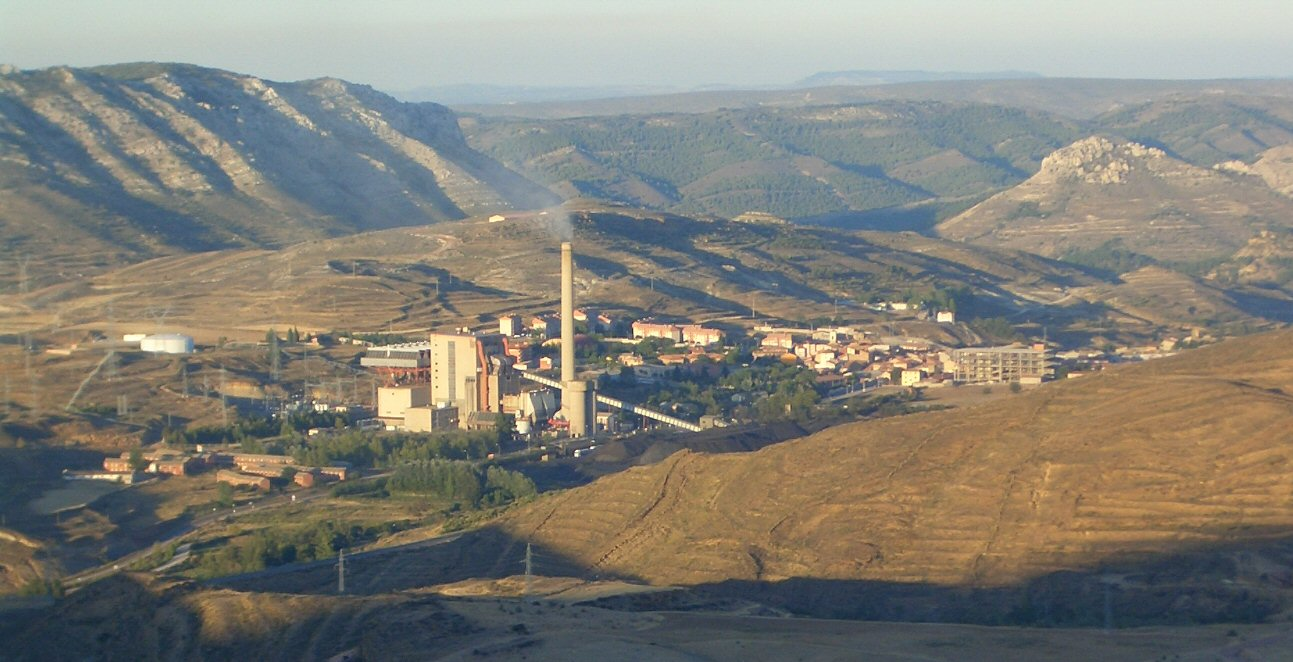

- Coat of arms

- Location within Spain
- Coordinates: 40°48′N 0°49′W
- Country: Spain
- Autonomous community: Aragon
- Province: Teruel
- Municipality: Escucha

Area
  - Total: 41.6 km^{2} (16.1 sq mi)
- Elevation: 1,072 m (3,517 ft)

Population (2025-01-01)
  - Total: 788
  - Density: 18.9/km^{2} (49.1/sq mi)
- Time zone: UTC+1 (CET)
  - Summer (DST): UTC+2 (CEST)

Escucha is a municipality located in the province of Teruel, Aragon, Spain. According to the 2005 census (INE), the municipality had a population of 1,097 inhabitants.

== See also ==
- List of municipalities in Teruel
