= Utrillas =

- municipality
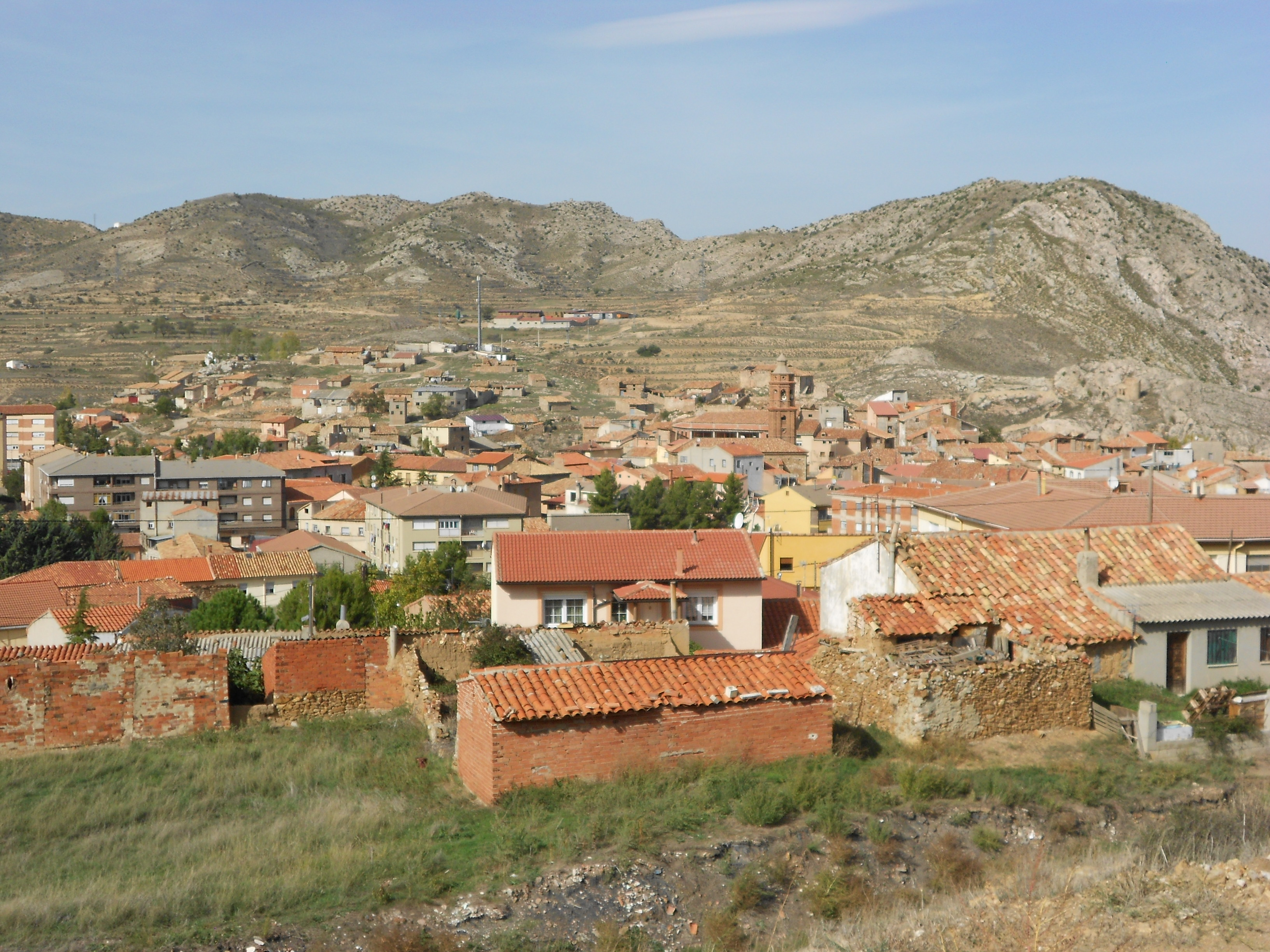
- Utrillas

- Coat of arms

- Location within Spain
- Coordinates: 40°49′N 0°51′W
- Country: Spain
- Autonomous community: Aragon
- Province: Teruel

Area
  - Total: 40 km^{2} (15 sq mi)
- Elevation: 968 m (3,176 ft)

Population (2025-01-01)
  - Total: 3,069
  - Density: 77/km^{2} (200/sq mi)
- Time zone: UTC+1 (CET)
  - Summer (DST): UTC+2 (CEST)

Utrillas (Spanish: [uˈtɾi.ʎas]) is a municipality located in the province of Teruel, Aragon, Spain. According to the 2004 census (INE), the municipality has a population of 3,209 inhabitants. Utrillas has a Secondary School called IES Fernando Lázaro Carreter.

== See also ==
- List of municipalities in Teruel
