= Sierra de Cucalón =

Spanish long system of mountain ranges

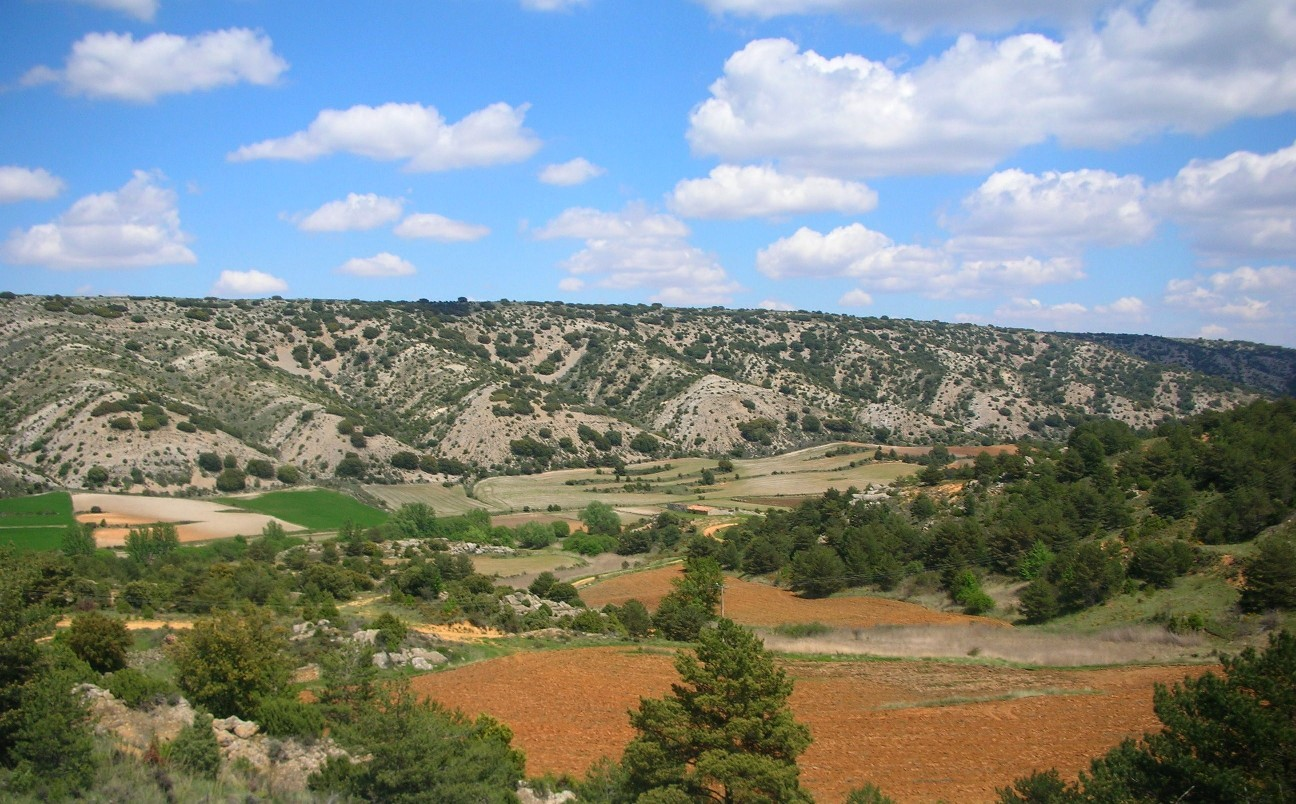
- Aspect of the Sierra de Oriche between Salcedillo and Allueva

Highest point
- Peak: Pelarda
- Elevation: 1,517 m (4,977 ft)
- Listing: List of mountains in Aragon
- Coordinates: 40°59′45″N 01°05′05″W

Geography
- Location within Spain
- Location: Cuencas Mineras & Jiloca Comarca (Aragon)
- Parent range: Iberian System

Geology
- Orogeny: Alpine orogeny
- Rock age: Mesozoic
- Rock type: Cretaceous limestone

Climbing
- First ascent: Unknown
- Easiest route: Drive from Allueva, Fonfría or Bea

Sierra de Cucalón is a 25-kilometre (16 mi) long system of mountain ranges in Aragon, Spain, located between the comarcas of Jiloca and Cuencas Mineras.

== Geography ==
These mountains are part of the Iberian System and are often covered with snow in the winter. Rivers Huerva and Martín have their source in these ranges.

The Ermita de la Virgen de Pelarda is located in the Pelarda range, close to Olalla.

=== Subranges ===
Two main ranges run parallel to each other, the northern one is Sierra de Oriche, also known as "Las Rochas", and the southern one, smoother and covered with forest, as Sierra de Pelarda or Sierra de la Pelarda (also known as "Sierra de Fonfría" after the town of Fonfría in its central section) extending eastwards as Sierra Pedregosa. This whole system of mountain ranges is named after the town of Cucalón, located at the western end.

The ridge's highest summits are Pelarda (1,517 m), in Sierra de Pelarda, and La Modorra (1,478 m), located at the NW end of the Sierra de Oriche. Other important summits are El Marujal (1,486 m), Cerro del Ortigal (1,429 m), Alto del Puerto de Fonfría (1,501 m), La Rocha (1,340 m) and La Retuerta (1,492 m). All main peaks are inconspicuous except for La Modorra.

== Ecology ==
The Sierra de Pelarda mountains are covered with forest made up pine, Carrasca (Quercus ilex), cork oak, and juniper trees. There are many endangered species living in these relatively uninhabited mountains, far from human intervention.

== Features ==
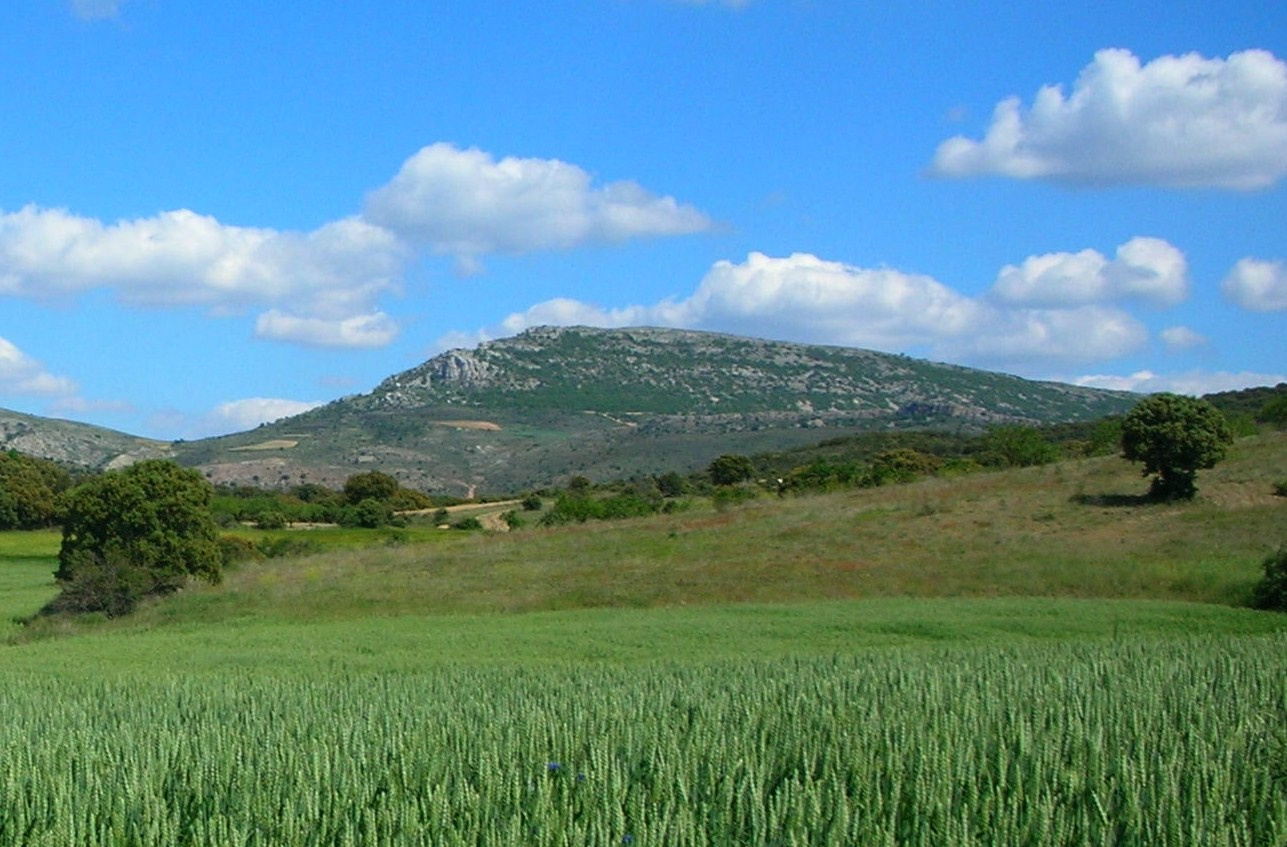
View of La Modorra from Lanzuela

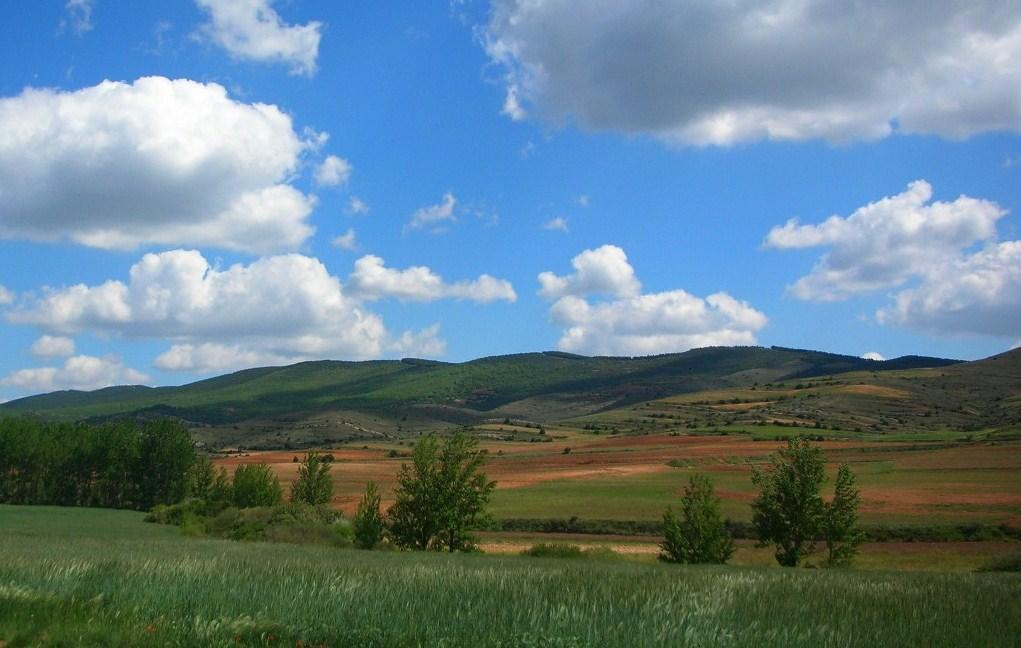
View of Sierra de Pelarda from Bea

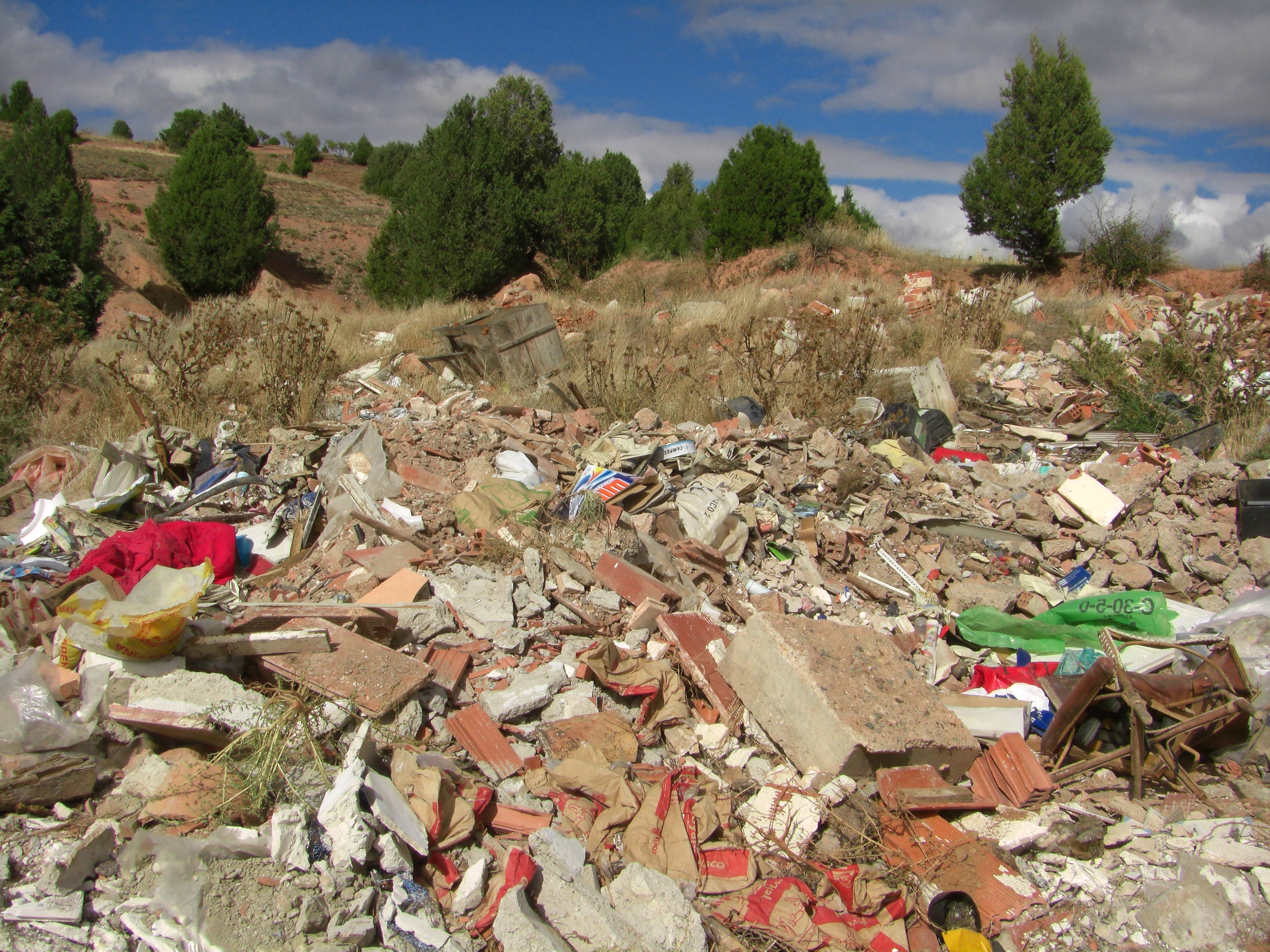
Juniper trees and garbage near Olalla
