= Serra de l'Espadella =

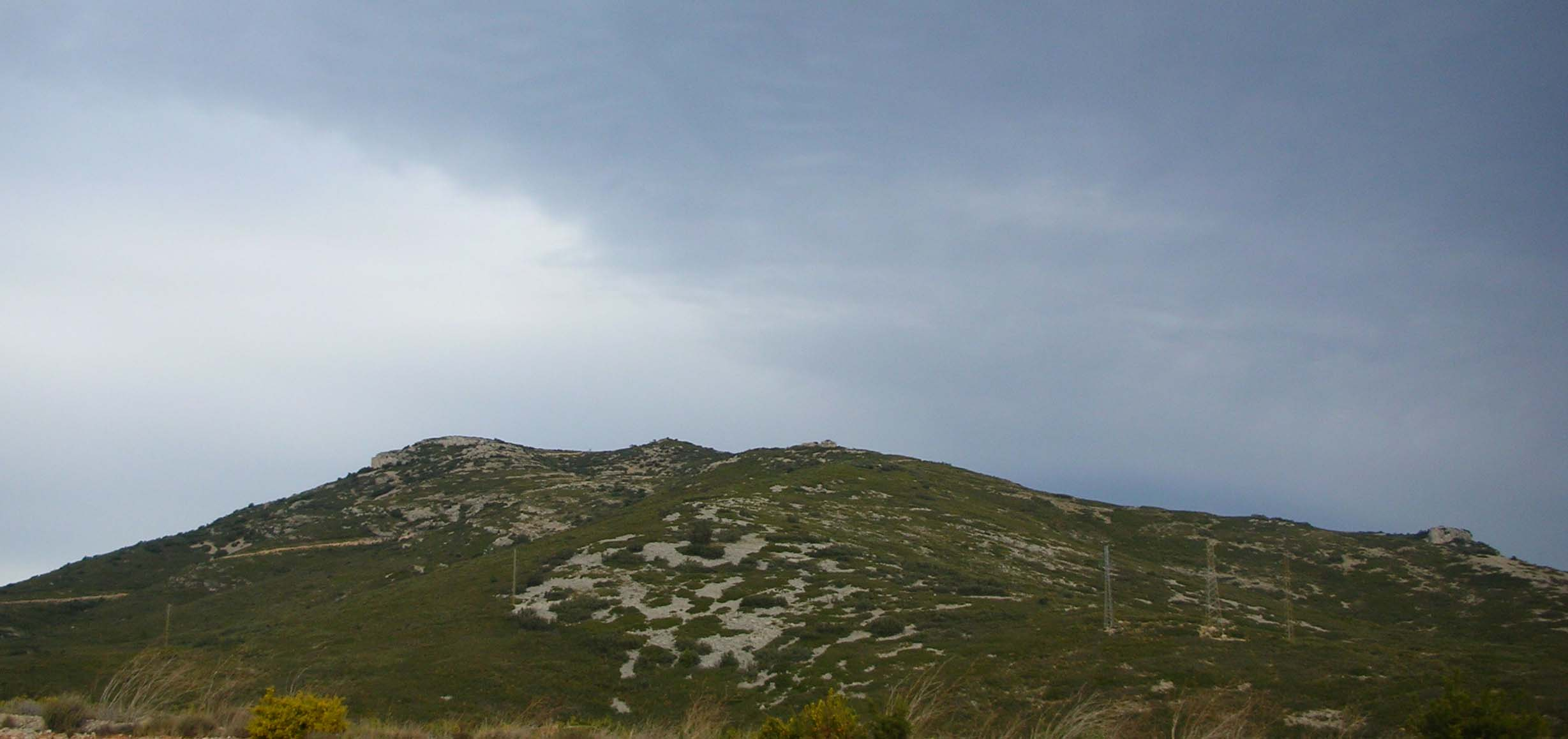

Highest point
- Peak: Espadella
- Elevation: 968 m (3,176 ft)
- Listing: List of mountains in the Valencian Community
- Coordinates: 40°32′52″N 0°5′23″E

Geography
- Location within Spain
- Location: Baix Maestrat, Valencian Community
- Parent range: Iberian System, Eastern end

Geology
- Orogeny: Alpine orogeny
- Rock type: Karstic

Climbing
- First ascent: Unknown
- Easiest route: From Vallivana or from Xert

Serra de l'Espadella (Spanish: Sierra de la Espandela) is an over 4 km (2 mi) long mountain range in the Baix Maestrat comarca, Valencian Community, Spain. Its highest point is Espadella (968 m). These mountains are frequently covered in snow in the winter.

== Geography ==
This mountain chain rises south of the Serra del Turmell, between the almost abandoned village of Vallivana and the Moles de Xert, to the northeast of the Serra de Vallivana, on the other side of the valley through which the N-232 road passes. This sparsely populated mountain area has the most important forested zone of the region.

The main wild animals in these unpopulated mountains are the Spanish Ibex, Roe Deer and Wild Boar.

== See also ==
- Maestrat/Maestrazgo
- Mountains of the Valencian Community
