= Enroig =

Village in Valencian Community, Spain

Coordinates: 40°30′47″N 0°07′10″E

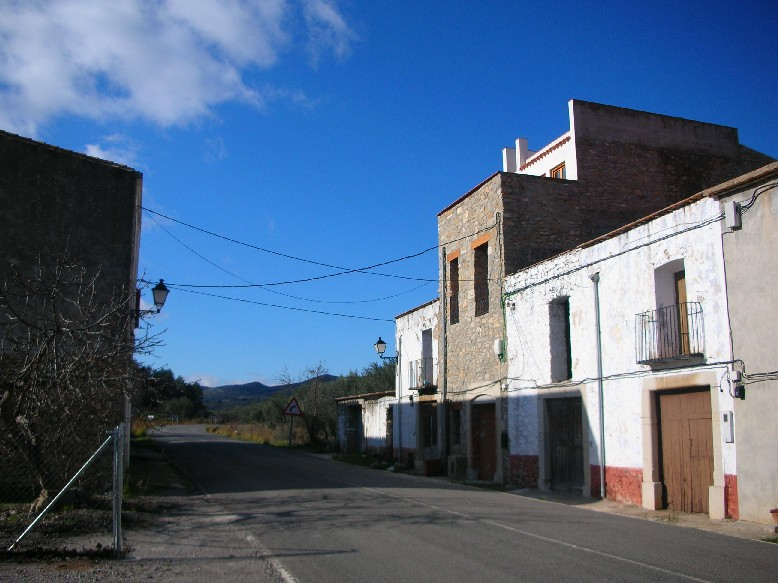
Enroig; western end of the village.

Enroig (Valencian pronunciation: [anˈrɔtʃ], Spanish: Anroig) is a small village located within Xert municipal term, Baix Maestrat. Its population was 51 inhabitants in 2006.

This small village is located 3 km west of Xert, close to the N-232 road. Until the mid 20th century there were inns for people travelling between Vinaròs and Morella or beyond. These inns provided food and rooms for travellers as well as stabling and fodder for the horses pulling the coaches.

Presently there is a small church and a few houses providing board and lodging for agritourists and hikers. Tourists come mainly for the beautiful and unspoilt mountain surroundings of this largely uninhabited area.

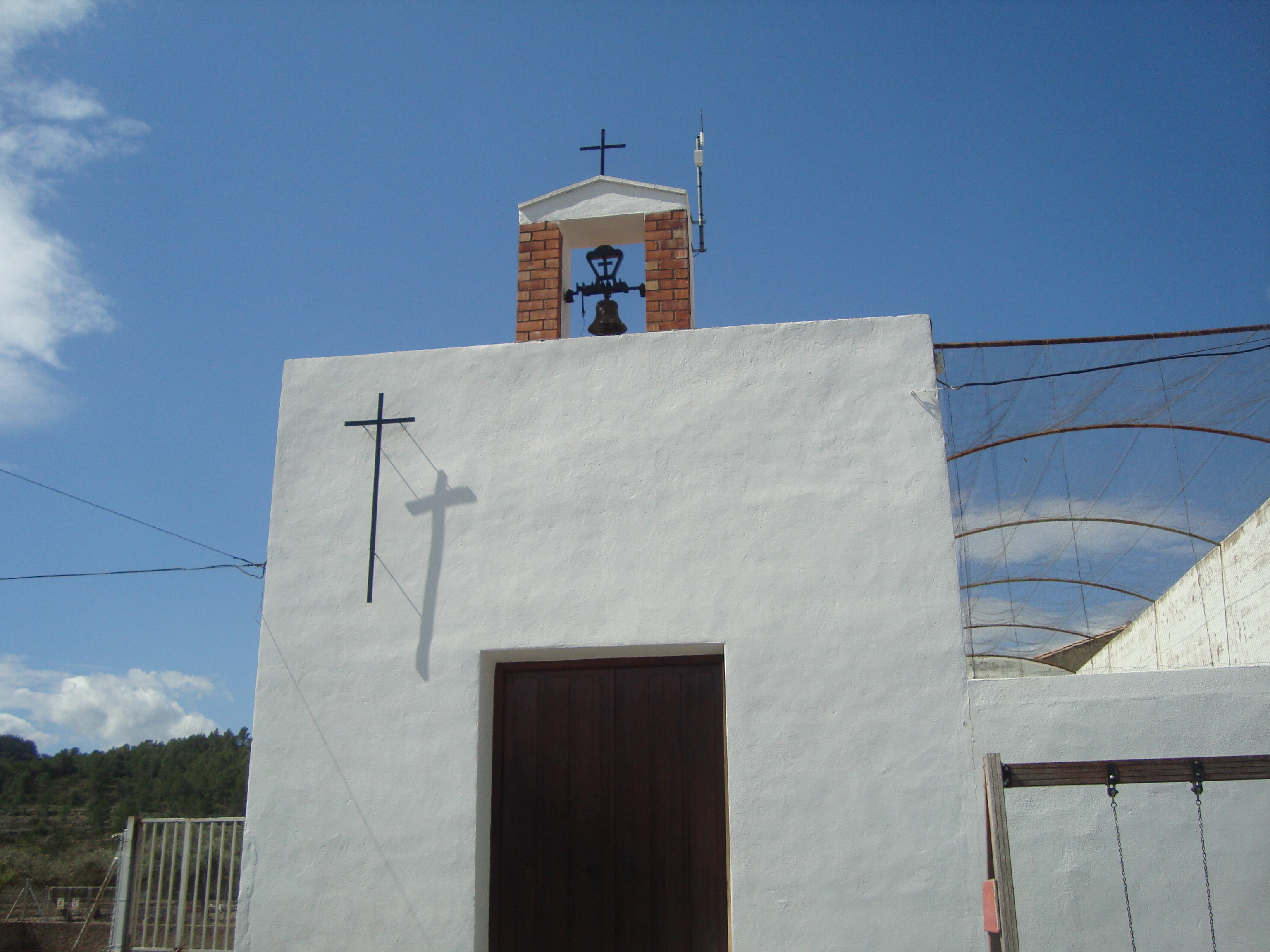
Chapel of Our Lady of the Pillar (Enroig, Xert)

The Rambla de Cervera flows right south of the village.
