= Virtus, Spain =

Spanish village in the province of Burgos

Virtus
- Town
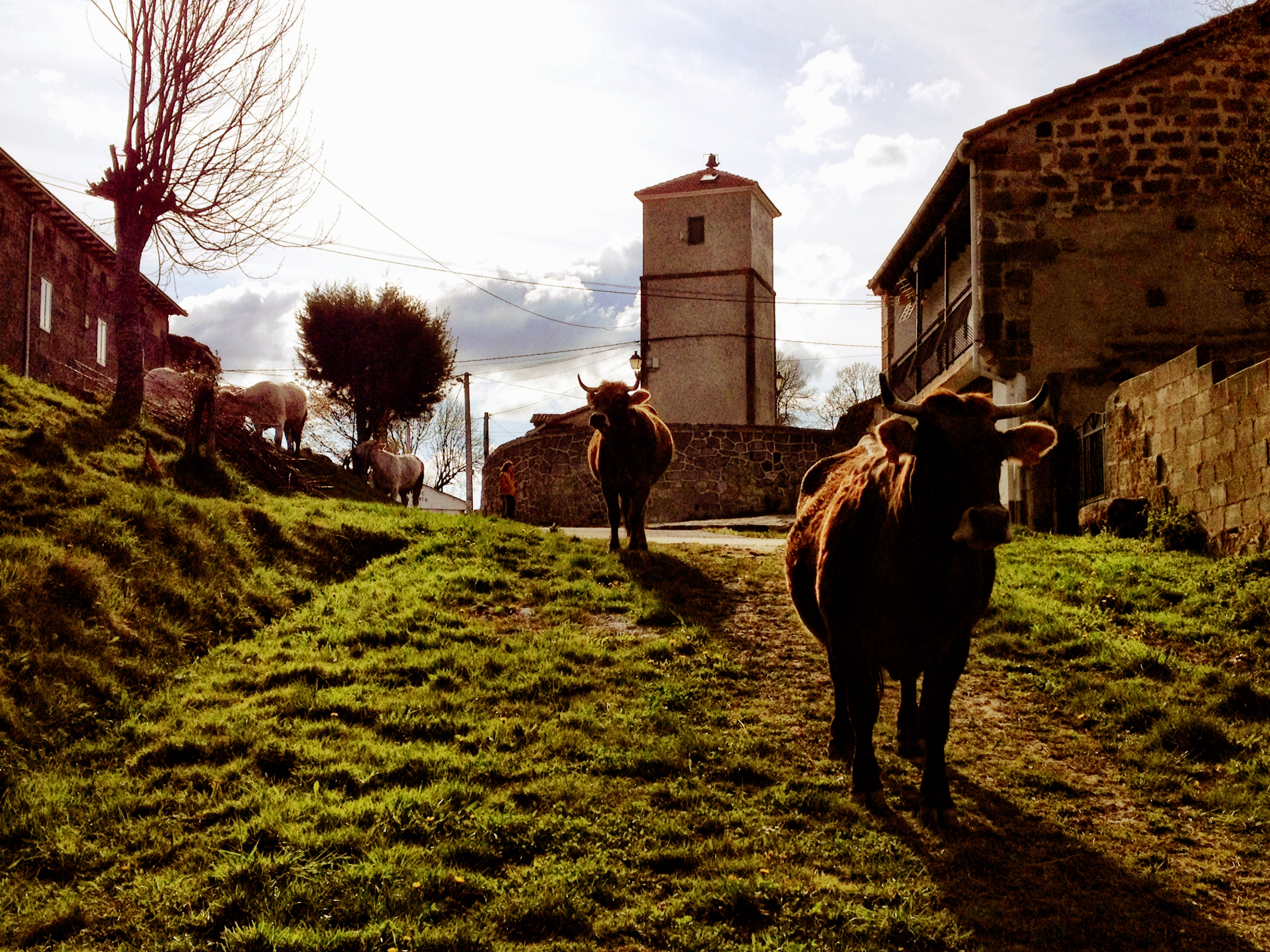
- Clock tower and surroundings of the square

- Coat of arms
- Etymology: Latin
- Interactive map of Virtus
- Location in the Province of Burgos Virtus (Castile and León) Virtus (Spain)
- Coordinates: 42°58′53″N 3°49′58″W
- Country: Spain
- Autonomous community: Castile and León
- Province: Burgos
- Comarca: Las Merindades
- Judicial district: Villarcayo
- Municipality: Valle de Valdebezana
- Founded: 9th century or before
- Named for: Virtue
- Main seat: Soncillo town hall
- Seat: Virtus town council
- Former main seat: Sedano town hall
- Neighbourhoods: Balneario de Corconte; Cabañas de Virtus; La Estación de Soncillo; Las Cabañas; La Paloma

Government
  - Mayor: María del Carmen Díaz (PP)
- Elevation: 863 m (2,831 ft)
- Highest elevation: 1,036 m (3,399 ft)
- Lowest elevation: 797 m (2,615 ft)

Population (2025)
  - Total: 62
- Time zone: UTC+1 (CET)
  - Summer (DST): UTC+2 (CEST)
- Postal code: 09572
- Vehicle registration: BU
- Local dialing code: 947
- Patron saint: Saint Blaise (February 3)
- Website: Ayuntamiento de Valle de Valdebezana

Virtus (Spanish pronunciation: [bˈiɾtus]) is a village located in the province of Burgos, autonomous community of Castile and León, Spain. Belonging to Las Merindades comarca, it is the third most populated town of the valley, after Soncillo and Cilleruelo de Bezana. Virtus holds a castle (Castillo de Virtus) and a pyramid (Pirámide de los Italianos); and it is linked with Santiago de Compostela through a variant of the Camino de Santiago known as Camino Olvidado.

== Toponym ==
The toponym springs from the Latin word virtus, alluding to the moral concept of virtue. In Spain, 186 people have it as a first surname, while it is the second surname of 192 individuals.

== Geography ==
The village is close to the southern side of the Puerto del Escudo and occupies a great part of N-623 road along this face.

=== Climate ===
Virtus has an oceanic climate, whose mean temperature is 11 °C (52 °F). However, its extreme temperatures go from −10 to 38 °C (14 to 100 °F). Precipitation, at an average of 1100 mm per annum, reaches a daily maximum of 70 mm.

=== Orography ===
It is placed on Cantabrian Mountains, near to Alto de la Maza mountain (1165 m or 3822 ft above sea level), and it also has a triangulation station known as Peña Plato (955 m or 3133 ft of elevation).

=== Hydrography ===
Its streams belong to the Ebro drainage basin, and they are the following ones: Gándara, Matorras, Praderas del Cuco, Puntillera, Regada and Salinas.

== Nature ==
=== Flora ===
Craggy areas are packed of holly trees, oak trees, pines, and show scarce beeches and willows. Flora includes edible and medicinal plants such as chamomile or common nettle, as well as bracken and false oat-grass.

=== Fauna ===
Deer, foxes, hares, hedgehogs, wild boars and wolves can be made out. Besides, Virtus shelters a wide variety of birds, namely common and lesser black-backed gulls, common buzzards, nightingales and ravens, Eurasian dotterel, gadwalls, greater flamingos, greater white-fronted geese, little bustards, merlins, pigeons, red-crested pochards, storks and tawny owls.

=== Geology ===
Local geomorphology shows the prevalence of Albian sandstone, leaving none but tiny zones for colluvial material, limestones and Keuper's sedimentary clays.

=== Protected areas ===
The outskirts of Ebro Reservoir are a protected area both in Cantabria and Castile and León autonomous communities.

== History ==
=== Middle ages ===
Its first human evidence are two groups of 9th century sepulchres 300 m (984 ft) far away denoting two Reconquista-arisen settlements, contemporary with the earliest written reference: The donation of several lands "in Bertux territory" to an Ovetense bishop by king Ordoño I of Asturias in 857.

It also began the construction of two of Virtus' most iconic edifices, Iglesia de Santa María (13th century) and Castillo de Virtus (14th century). Besides, Becerro de las Behetrías de Castilla book mentions that in 1352 Virtus belonged to Nuño Díaz de Haro (Lord of Biscay and head of House of Lara), swiftly transferred to Pedro Gómez de Porras' Majorat in 1376. (Note: Porras surname has been traced back to a servant of Blanca Garcés of Pamplona and Sancho III of Castile; and it alludes to Merindad de Valdeporres. Despite being less popular, Porres surname corresponds with Porras)

=== Early modern years ===
Granted that the castle arose as a tower house, it finally got its definitive form during this epoch. Simultaneously, the church evolved to a Latin cross plan. As several houses of the neighbourhood come from these years, so do the ruins of a watermill.

=== Late modern period ===
Virtus suffered the fallout from Spanish Civil War (1936-1939), specifically as a result of the Battle of the Ebro. In the aftermath, the construction of a mausoleum for Italian soldiers known as Pirámide de los Italianos took place.

=== Contemporary history ===
Lastly, locals put up the clock tower, located in Virtus' square.

== Human geography ==
=== Demography ===
Virtus had 62 inhabitants in 2025, according to National Statistics Institute.

Recent demographic results
2000	2004	2008	2012	2016	2020	2024
96	92	84	78	82	71	63

=== Urbanism ===
Facilities include a square, a clock tower, a traditional bowley alley, a park, a sports pitch, and two viewpoints.

==== Architecture ====
Houses tend to be unifamiliar, consisting of two or three levels, and stone-made. Facades, if painted, are white or pastel coloured. Moreover, they frequently include a small garden in the same patch.

=== Transport ===
==== Roads ====
Code	Class	Itinerary
N-232	Highway	Vinaroz to Las Cabañas
N-623	Highway	Burgos to Santander
CL-630	Road	Corconte to La Paloma
BU-564	Local road	Cilleruelo de Bezana to Soncillo
BU-574	Local road	Vegaloscorrales to La Paloma
BU-V-5791	Local road	Virtus to La Estación de Soncillo
BU-V-6425	Local road	Cabañas de Virtus to Villamediana de San Román

==== Train ====
La Robla's train has stops in Las Cabañas and La Estación de Soncillo.

==== Bus ====
There are daily routes with destination to Torrelavega, Santander, Burgos and Madrid; however the bus stop is in Cabañas de Virtus.

==== Other media ====
The closest airport is Santander Airport, 65 km (40 mi) away.

=== Economy ===
==== Primary sector ====
The principal economic activity is cattle farming, which is strongly conditioned by land consolidation, the use of agricultural machinery, a scarce number of farmers, and the breakdown of both agronomy and milk farming. Activities as hunting, wildcrafting, beekeeping and tree harvesting are no longer profitable.

==== Secondary sector ====
Electricity generation has changed the scenery, providing it with high voltage power lines and wind parks oriented towards Virtus' substation, which belongs to Herrera de Pisuera-Güeñes stretch. There also are forge and mineral water business.

==== Tertiary sector ====
Services rely on SMEs seeking estival tourism: Notably the ones that rent kitesurfing equipment and motorcycles. They make up a small part of the economy and involve scarce population.

==== Available income ====
National Statistics Institute does not offer data for Virtus, but it does give a municipal reference: In 2022, Valle de Valdebezana's per capita income was 12,233 euros.

== Government ==
=== Local government ===
Juan Carlos Díaz (PCAS-TC) was the previous mayor until 2019, when María del Carmen Díaz (PP) was elected.

=== Judicial government ===
In as much as Virtus belongs to Valle de Valdebezana, Villarcayo de Merindad de Castilla la Vieja judicial district is in force here.

== Culture ==
=== Remarkable sites ===
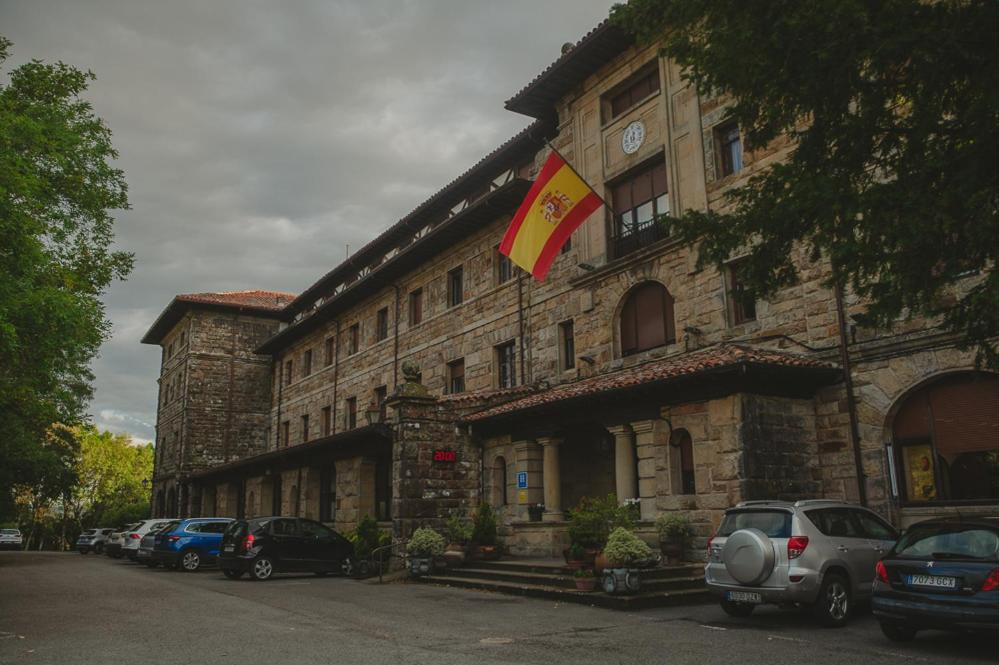

==== Balneario de Corconte ====
This eclectic mansion, designed by Lavín del Noval architect, was constructed in 1890 using ashlars. It also became a strategic point during the Battle of Ebro (1938).

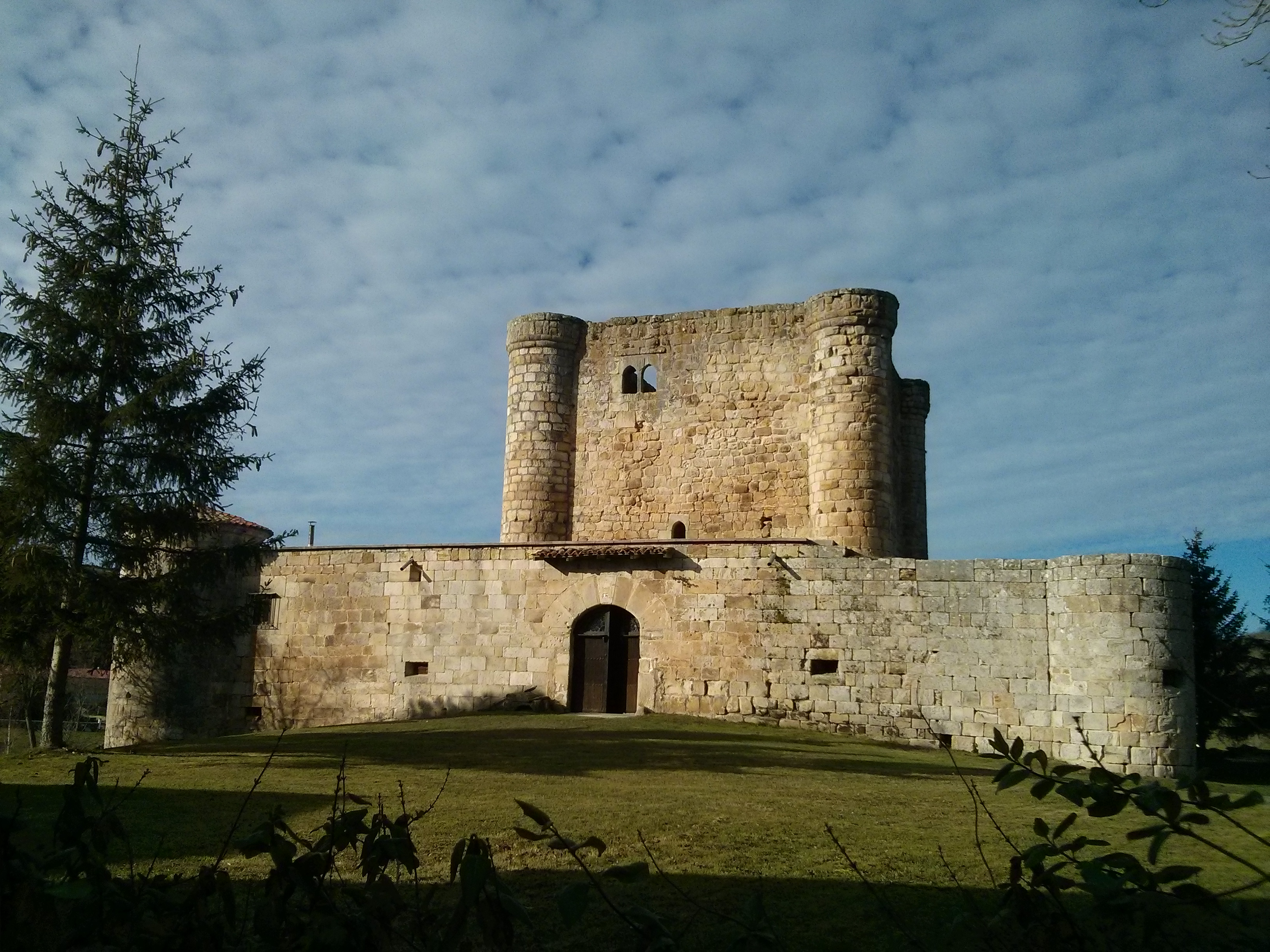

==== Castillo de los Porras ====
Castillo de los Porras is a gothic barbican, also made with ashlars, and built during fourteenth, fifteenth and sixteenth centuries. Its main entrance consists of a basket-handle arch, and nowadays, the edifice is a private residence.

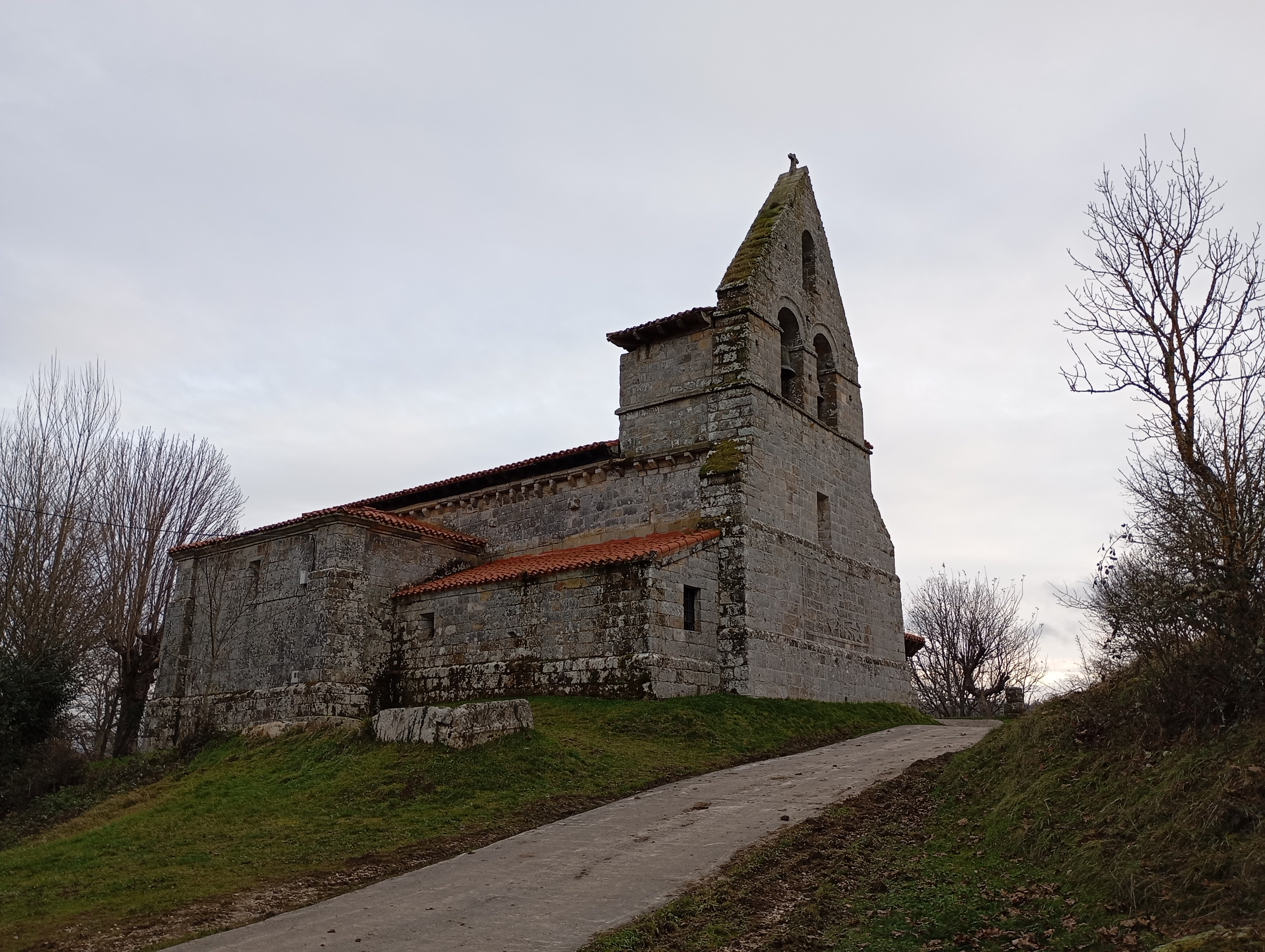

==== Iglesia de Santa María la Mayor ====
A Romanesque church with animal, human and vegetal motifs, a notable bell-gable including two semicircular arches, and a semi-dome. It is the oldest building of the village, glaringly ashlar-made, and whose construction started in the thirteenth century and finished in the eighteenth century.

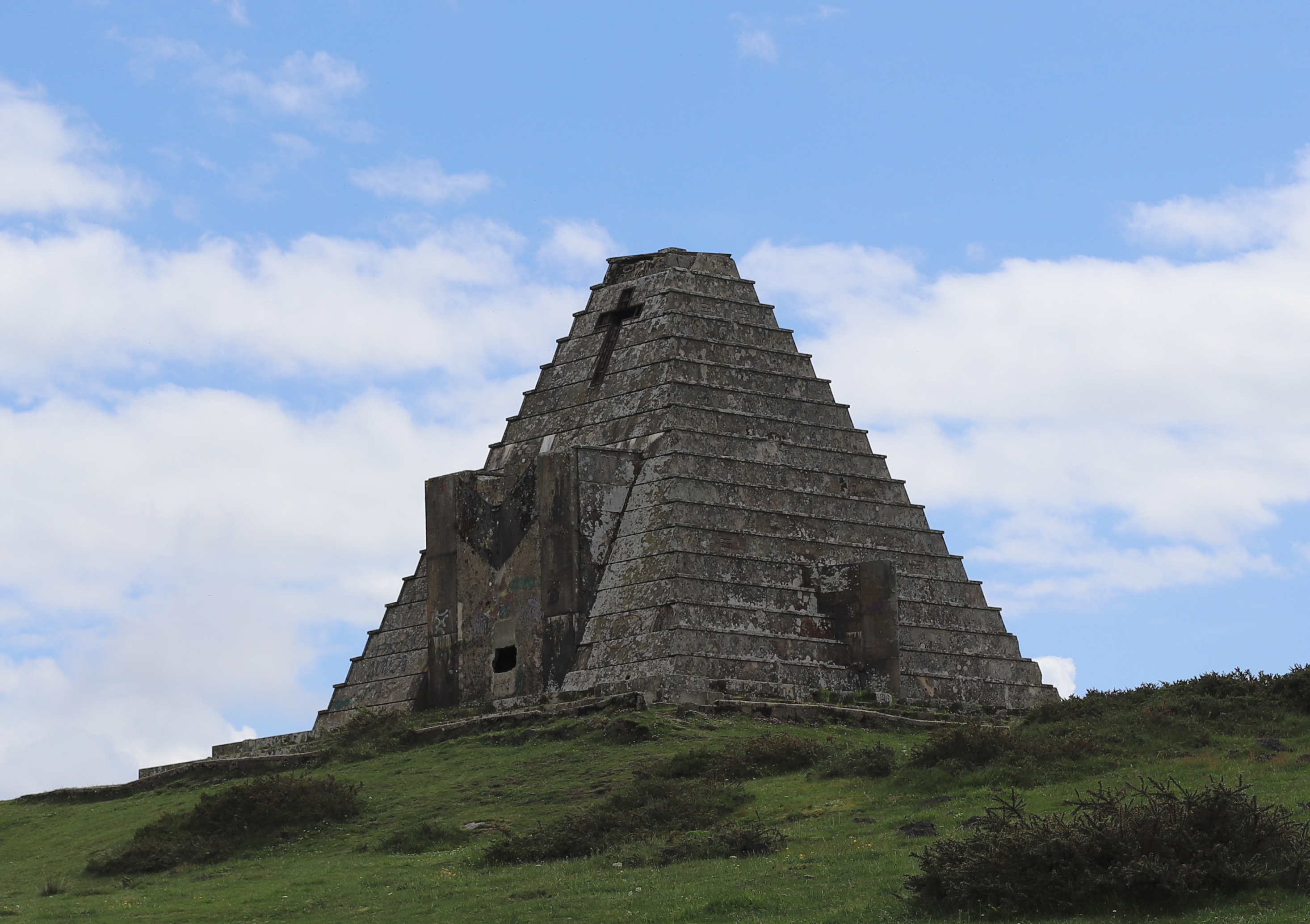

==== Pirámide de los italianos ====
A Rationalist shrine, built amid 1938 and 1939, using limestone-covered concrete, under the supervision of Attilio Radic architect and Pietro di Varzi military chaplain. The main purpose of this pyramidal building 20 m (66 ft) tall, was to bury Italian casualties from the offensive that Nationalist faction rose above Republican Santander as a part of Spanish Civil War.

=== Cultural activities ===
During July and August there are lectures, workshops and film projections.

=== Sports ===
Locals play a variation of bowling known as bolos tres tablones.

=== Feasts ===
Virtus celebrates Nativity of Mary on the second Sunday of September.

=== Gastronomy ===
Typical gastronomy derives from local foods: Cereals, eggs, meat, milk and vegetables, yielding blood sausage, hornazo or Spanish omelette. The diet reflects the distance from the sea, traditional activities as pig slaughter, and technological advances like rail transport which caused the invention of railroad pots. (Note: Railroad pots, locally known as ollas ferroviarias, are a kind of stew cooked by train workers of a coal route from La Robla to Bilbao before its modernization)

=== Media ===
==== Press ====
Crónica de las Merindades, a free newspaper with a monthly impression on both paper and digital formats, is the main journal of Las Merindades comarca.

==== Radio ====
Local radios are Radio Espinosa Merindades (Espinosa de los Monteros) and Radio Valdivielso (Quintana de Valdivielso, Merindad de Valdivielso).

==== Television ====
Apart from nationally broadcast channels, Castile and León autonomous community offers La 7 and La 8 channels.

== Bibliography ==
- Arribas Magro, María del Carmen Sonsoles (2012). Las Merindades de Burgos: Un análisis jurisdiccional y socioeconómico desde la Antigüedad a la Edad Media (PDF) (PhD thesis) (in Spanish). University of Burgos. doi:10.36443/10259/201.
- Benito-Calvo, Alfonso; Bermejo, Lucía; Karampaglidis, Theodoros; et al. (2021). "Prehistoric Human Tracks in Ojo Guareña Cave System (Burgos, Spain): The Sala and Galerías de las Huellas". In Pastoors, Andreas; Lenssen-Erz, Tilman (eds.). Reading Prehistoric Human Tracks. Methods & Material (PDF). Cham, Switzerland: Springer. pp. 317–344. doi:10.1007/978-3-030-60406-6. ISBN 978-3-030-60406-6.
- Galán Díaz, Javier; García Antón, Mercedes (2018), Gonzalo, Mateo Sanz (ed.), Introducción a la flora de los bosques del Valle de Valdebezana (Burgos) (PDF), Flora Montiberica (in Spanish), vol. 71, Valencia, pp. 61–84, ISSN 1138-5952
- Garate Maidagan, Diego; García Moreno, Alejandro; Sainz-Maza Sainz-Maza, Eduardo (2021), Nuevas evidencias de arte rupestre postpaleolítico en Las Merindades (Burgos) (PDF), Zephyrus (in Spanish), vol. 88, University of Salamanca, pp. 15–40, doi:10.14201/zephyrus20218 (inactive 1 July 2025), ISSN 0514-7336
- García Sánchez, Jesús (2008), El uso político de objetos arqueológicos: las estelas gigantes de Cantabria (PDF), Saldvie: Estudios de prehistoria y arqueología (in Spanish), vol. 9, University of Zaragoza, pp. 249–263, ISSN 1576-6454
- Maira Vidal, Rocío (2019). del Cueto Ruiz-Funes, Juan Ignacio; Huerta, Santiago; Méndez Pineda, Valeria M (eds.). Tercer Congreso Internacional Hispanoamericano de Historia de la construcción (PDF) (in Spanish). Vol. 2. Mexico City: Instituto Juan de Herrera. Petrificación de la riqueza. La construcción medieval en las Merindades de Burgos. ISBN 978-84-9728-570-4.
- Reina Aguilar, Ángel (2021), Aproximación a una comparativa jurídica entre el waqf y el mayorazgo castellano: El waqf de al-Šāfi'ī, al-waṯā'iq de Abū Isḥāq al-Ġarnāṭī y tres ejemplos jienenses de los siglos XIV, XV y XVI (PDF), eHumanista IVITRA (in Spanish), vol. 19, University of California, Santa Barbara, pp. 541–555, ISSN 1540-5877
