= Vallivana =

Coordinates: 40°32′23″N 0°03′12″E

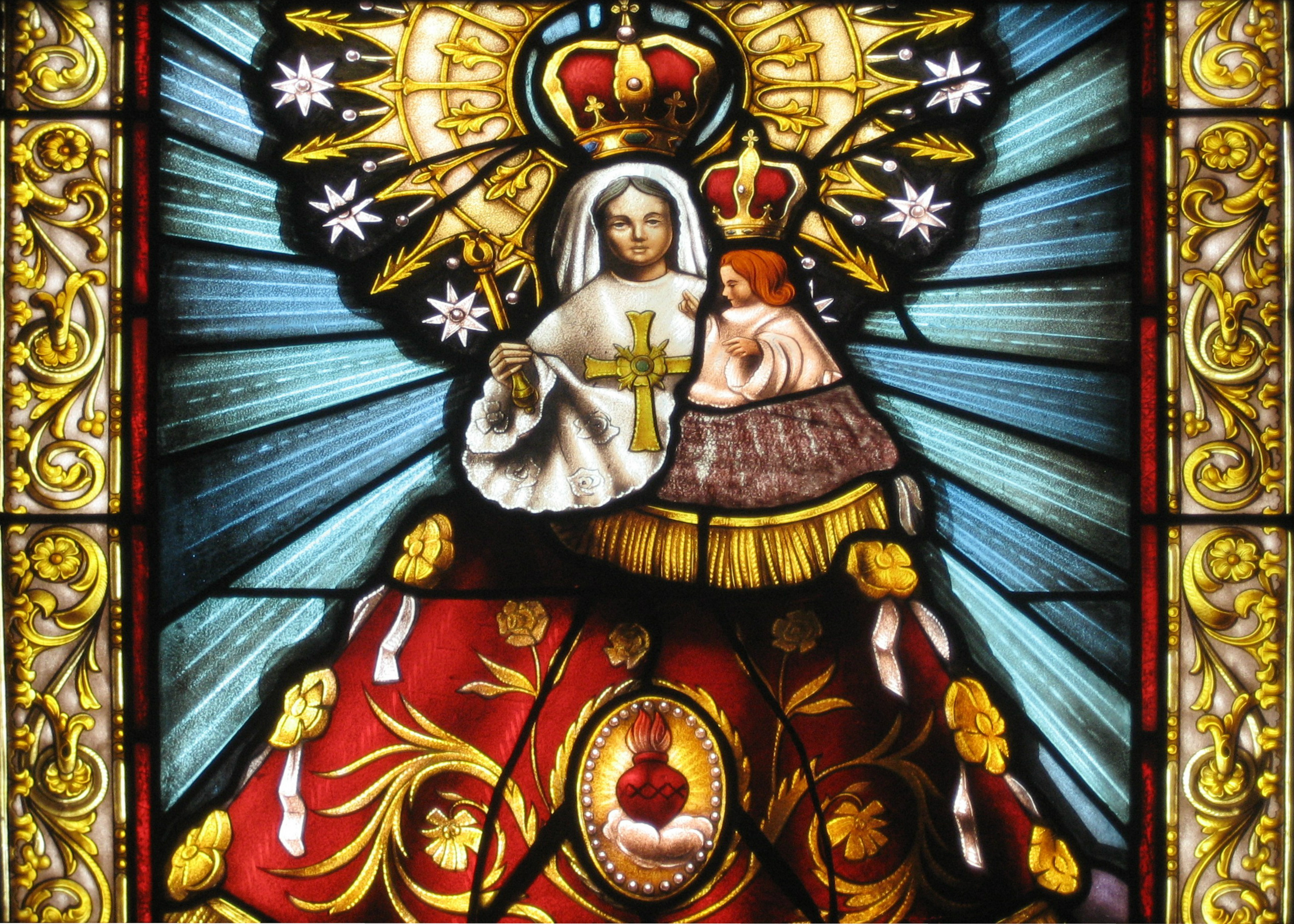
The Virgin of Vallivana represented in a stained glass window at San José de Jatibonico parish, Cuba.

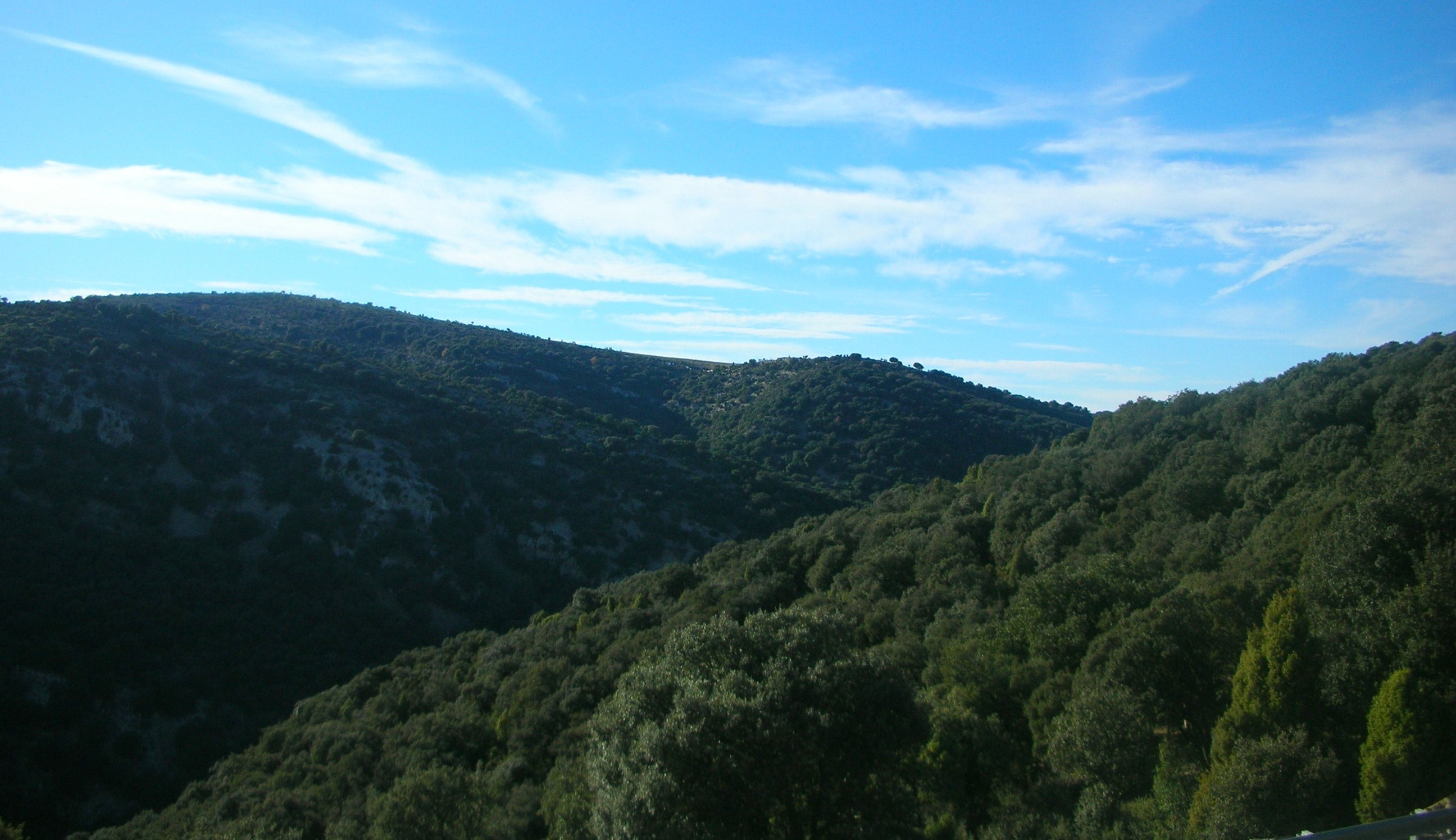
View of the Serra de Vallivana, the mountain range that towers over the area.

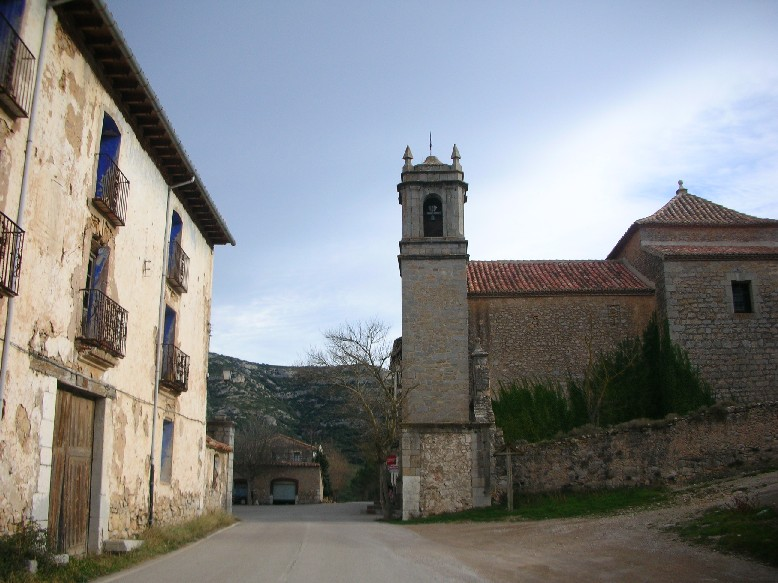
The church of Vallivana and an abandoned house.

Vallivana is a small settlement belonging to Morella, Ports (comarca).

== Description ==
Vallivana is an almost deserted cluster of houses 24 kilometres (15 mi) southeast of Morella. It is located at the eastern end of the Dena de Coll i Moll, right by N-232 road between Vinaròs and Morella.

In 1672, during a severe plague epidemic, the citizens of Morella brought the statue of the Virgin Mary from the Sanctuary of Vallivana, and carried it in a procession through the streets of the town. The plague disappeared from the city never to return.

To commemorate this event every six years the Sexenni de Morella festival takes place in the town for nine days in late August. The virgin is carried in procession and the traditional town guilds perform ancient dances in her honour. The festivities in 2006 were the first of the 21st century.

This small place gives its name to the Serra de Vallivana, a mountain range that rises over Vallivana. This area has the most important forested zone of the region. The rockier and less forested Serra de l'Espadella rises to the northeast, on the other side of the valley through which the road passes.

There is also a restaurant and a forestry department office. Most of the remaining dwellings lie abandoned.

This place is not to be confused with Vallibona, a small town in the same area further north over the Serra del Turmell mountain range.

== Places of interest ==
- Capella de la Mare de Déu de Vallivana, the church guarding the image of the virgin.

== See also ==
- Morella
