= Valle de Valdebezana =

- municipality
- Coat of arms

- Location in Spain.
- Coordinates: 42°58′14″N 3°47′09″W
- Country: Spain
- Autonomous community: Castile and León
- Province: Burgos
- Comarca: Las Merindades

Government
  - Mayor: Florentino Ruiz Ruiz

Area
  - Total: 156 km^{2} (60 sq mi)

Population (2025-01-01)
  - Total: 479
  - Density: 3.07/km^{2} (7.95/sq mi)
- Time zone: UTC+1 (CET)
  - Summer (DST): UTC+2 (CEST)

Valle de Valdebezana is a municipality located in the province of Burgos, Castile and León, Spain.

== See also ==
- Virtus
