= Antonio Royo Marín =

Spanish Dominican theologian (1913–2005)

The Reverend Father Antonio Royo Marín O.P.

Orders
- Ordination: 1944

Personal details
- Born: Antonio Royo Marín; 9 January 1913 Morella
- Died: 17 April 2005 (aged 92) Villava
- Denomination: Catholic (Latin Church)
- Profession: Priest; teacher; theologian

Ordination history of Antonio Royo Marín
History
Priestly ordination
- Date: 1944

Antonio Royo Marín, O.P. (Morella, Castellón, 9 January 1913 – Villava, 17 April 2005), was a Spanish Dominican priest and theologian. He was an influential theologian and moralist, specially as a Thomist.

== Biography ==
He was the third of seven children. He moved with his family to Madrid in 1928, aged 15 years old. He soon joined the Catholic Union of Atocha. He asked to join the Dominican novitiate, but a bout of tuberculosis made him return to his family home. He started studying Philosophy at Madrid Seminary, probably in 1934/35. He was captured twice by Republican militiamen during the Spanish Civil War but escaped execution. He later said that he believed that he wasn't worthy of martyrdom, and because of this God spared his life.

He joined the Dominican Order in 1939 and was ordained a priest in 1944. He was a teacher of Moral and Dogmatic Theology at the University of San Estebán, in Salamanca. He was approved "summa cum laude" with his Doctorate thesis, Teología de la Perfección Cristiana (Theology of the Christian Perfection), in June 1948, published in 1954, which would become his most famous work, being translated into several languages.

He was awarded the medal Pro Ecclesia et Pontifice by Pope John Paul II.

== Works ==
- 1943 - Teología de la perfección cristiana.
- 1956 - Teología de la salvación.
- 1956 - Las siete Palabras de Nuestro Señor Jesucristo en la cruz.
- 1957 - Teología moral para seglares.
- 1957 - El misterio del más allá, Rialp.
- 1959 - El mundo de hoy, Rialp
- 1960 - Teología de la caridad. Madrid: B.A.C.
- 1963 - Dios y su obra. Madrid: B.A.C.
- 1961 - Jesucristo y la vida cristiana. Madrid: B.A.C.
- 1965 - La vida religiosa. Madrid: B.A.C.
- 1967 - Espiritualidad de los seglares. Madrid: B.A.C.
- 1968 - La Virgen María. Teología y espiritualidad marianas. Madrid: B.A.C.
- 1969 - Teología de la esperanza. Respuesta a la angustia existencialista. Madrid: B.A.C.
- 1970 - Doctoras de la Iglesia: Doctrina espiritual de Santa Teresa y Santa Catalina de Siena. Madrid: B.A.C.
- 1970 - La fe de la Iglesia. Lo que ha de creer el cristiano de hoy. Madrid: B.A.C.
- 1972 - El gran desconocido. El Espíritu Santo y sus dones. Madrid: B.A.C.
- 1973 - Los grandes maestros de la vida espiritual. Historia de la espiritualidad cristiana. Madrid: B.A.C.
- 1975 - La oración del cristiano. Madrid: B.A.C.
- 1977 - Somos hijos de Dios. Misterio de la divina gracia. Madrid: B.A.C.
- 1984 - Una oración espléndida. Elevación a la Santísima Trinidad, Editora Palabra
- 1995 - ¿Se salvan todos?: estudio teológico sobre la voluntad salvífica universal de Dios. Madrid: B.A.C.
- 1997 - El sacramento del perdón. Madrid: B.A.C.
- 1998 - Santa Teresa de Lisieux, Doctora de la Iglesia. Madrid: B.A.C.
- 1999 - Alabanza a la Santísima Trinidad. Madrid: B.A.C.
- 2000 - Ser o no ser santo… Ésta es la cuestión. Madrid: B.A.C.
- 2001 - Por qué soy católico. Confirmación en la fe. Madrid: B.A.C.
- 2002 - Doctoras de la iglesia. Santa Teresa de Jesús, Santa Catalina de Siena y Santa Teresa de Lisieux. Madrid: B.A.C.
- 2003 - Sentir con la Iglesia: la Iglesia de Cristo y la salvación eterna. Madrid: B.A.C.
