= Moles de Xert =

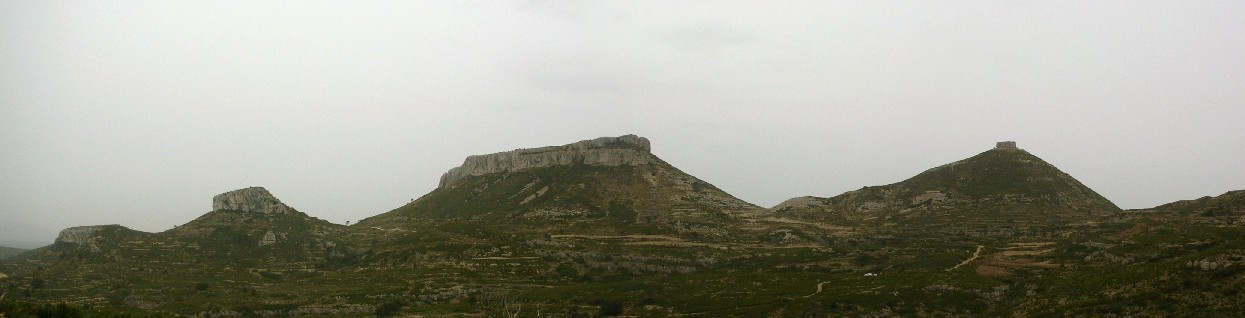

Highest point
- Peak: Mola Gran
- Elevation: 806 m (2,644 ft)
- Listing: List of mountains in the Valencian Community
- Coordinates: 40°31′54″N 0°9′7″E

Geography
- Location within Spain
- Location: Baix Maestrat, Valencian Community
- Parent range: Iberian System, Eastern end

Geology
- Orogeny: Alpine orogeny
- Rock type: Karstic

Climbing
- Easiest route: First drive, then hike from Xert or from Canet lo Roig

Moles de Xert (Valencian pronunciation: [ˈmɔlez ðe ˈtʃɛɾt], Spanish: Muelas de Chert) is a 4.2 km (3 mi) long mountain range in the Baix Maestrat comarca, Valencian Country, Spain. Its highest point is Mola Gran (806 m). The other main summits are Mola Murada, a breast-shaped hill, Moleta Redona and Mola Llarga. These mountains have very original shapes, topped by regular rocky outcrops resembling castles or fortifications. They are frequently covered in snow in the winter.

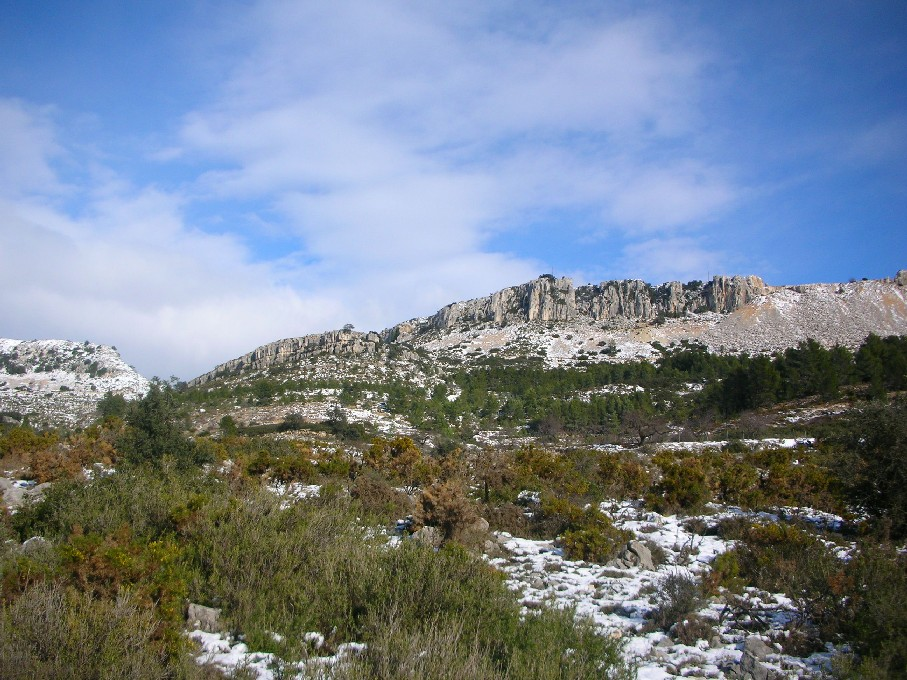
Halfway up the slope of Mola Gran in the winter showing rock slide caused by marble quarry on the right side

The main mountain, Mola Gran, has been disfigured on the southern side by a stone quarry that left a very visible scarred surface with a large rock slide.

There are remains of an ancient Iberian Ilercavones settlement in the Mola Murada.

Wildlife, like Spanish Ibex, Roe Deer and Wild Boar, is abundant in these lonely mountains.

== Location ==
This mountain chain rises above the town of Xert and right to the NE of Serra de l'Espadella, east of the Maestrat mountains of which they could be considered foothills.

The abandoned villages of La Barcella and Fontanals are located in these mountains.

== See also ==
- Maestrat/Maestrazgo
- Mountains of the Valencian Community
