= N-623 road (Spain) =

Road in Spain

National road N-623
- Carretera nacional N-623

Route information
- Length: 153 km (95 mi)

Major junctions
- From: Burgos
- To: Santander

Location
- Country: Spain

Highway system
- Highways in Spain; Autopistas and autovías; National Roads

The N-623 is a highway in northern Spain. It connects Burgos with Santander.

It starts at Burgos on the Autovía A-62 and a junction with N-1 road. It passes through the city over the River Arlanzon. It then heads north having a junction with the N-627.

The road then climbs to cross the Puerto del Paramo de Masa and then Portillo del Fresno (1,050 m). The road then winds down to the Upper Ebro valley. There is a junction with the N-232 at the eastern edge of the Embalse del Ebro. The road then climbs again into the Cordillera Cantabria crossing Puerto del Escudo (1,100m). Continuing along a narrow valley the road reaches the N-634. Thereafter, the road turns north east towards Santander and a junction with the Autovía A-67.
