= Serra del Turmell =

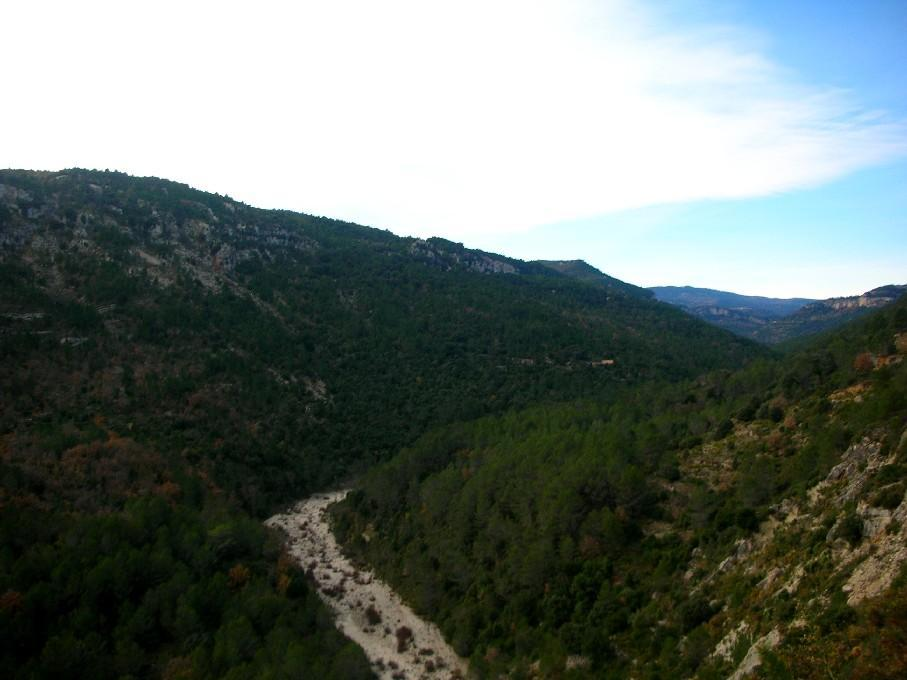
- View of the wooded northern slopes of the range and the Cervol River

Highest point
- Peak: Tossal Gros or El Turmell
- Elevation: 1,276 m (4,186 ft)
- Listing: List of mountains in the Valencian Community
- Coordinates: 40°34′31″N 0°9′5″E

Dimensions
- Length: 12 km (7.5 mi) E/W
- Width: 3 km (1.9 mi) N/S

Geography
- Location within Spain
- Location: Baix Maestrat, Valencian Community
- Parent range: Iberian System, eastern end

Geology
- Rock type: Limestone

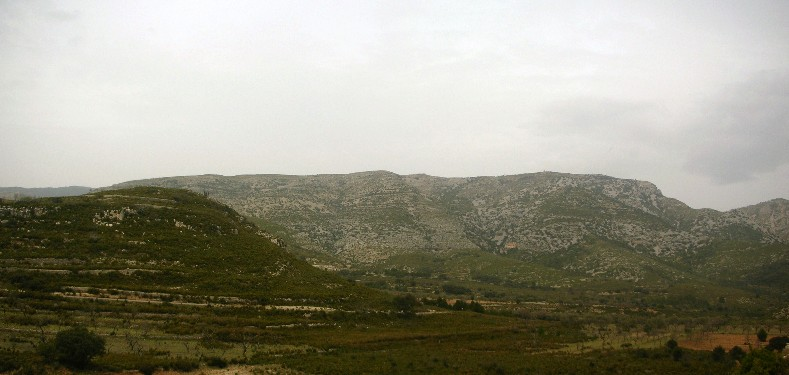
View of the southern slopes of the range with the exposed bare rock

Serra del Turmell, also known as Serra del Mont Turmell, (Spanish: Sierra del Turmell) is an over 12 km (7 mi) long mountain range in the Baix Maestrat comarca, Valencian Community, Spain.

These mountains and their neighboring ranges are a desolate place with little human habitation. Their summits are frequently covered in snow in the winter. The Cervol River has its sources in this range.

There was much activity of the Spanish Maquis in this range and the neighboring areas after the Spanish Civil War and well into the 1960s.

== Geography ==
The highest point in the Serra del Turmell range is 1,276 m high Tossal Gros, also known as El Turmell, meaning 'the ankle'. Another important peak is the Mola de Penyablanca. There is a cellular repeater and other antennas atop the highest peak. There is also a shrine or small chapel dedicated to Saint Agatha in the high slopes of the range.

This mountain chain rises east of Rossell town and its western end merges with the Serra de Vallivana range in the area of the Port de Querol mountain pass in the N-232 road. The easiest route to reach the range is from Xert, Vallibona or Morella.

== Ecology ==
The northern slopes of the Serra del Turmell are covered with Mediterranean forest of holm oak and pine, while the southern slopes are almost denuded of vegetation with the grey limestone rocks exposed among scattered clumps of shrub. There are large prey birds such as the griffon vulture, as well as wild animals such as the Spanish ibex, roe deer and wild boar.

The ranges of this sparsely populated mountain area have the most important forested zone of the region. Thus the area of this range together with the neighboring Tinença de Benifassà and Serra de Vallivana was declared a Site of Community Importance by the European Union under the name Tinença de Benifassà, Turmell i Vallivana.

== See also ==
- Mountains of the Valencian Community
- Vallibona
- Maestrat/Maestrazgo
- List of Sites of Community Importance in Spain
