= Serra de Vallivana =

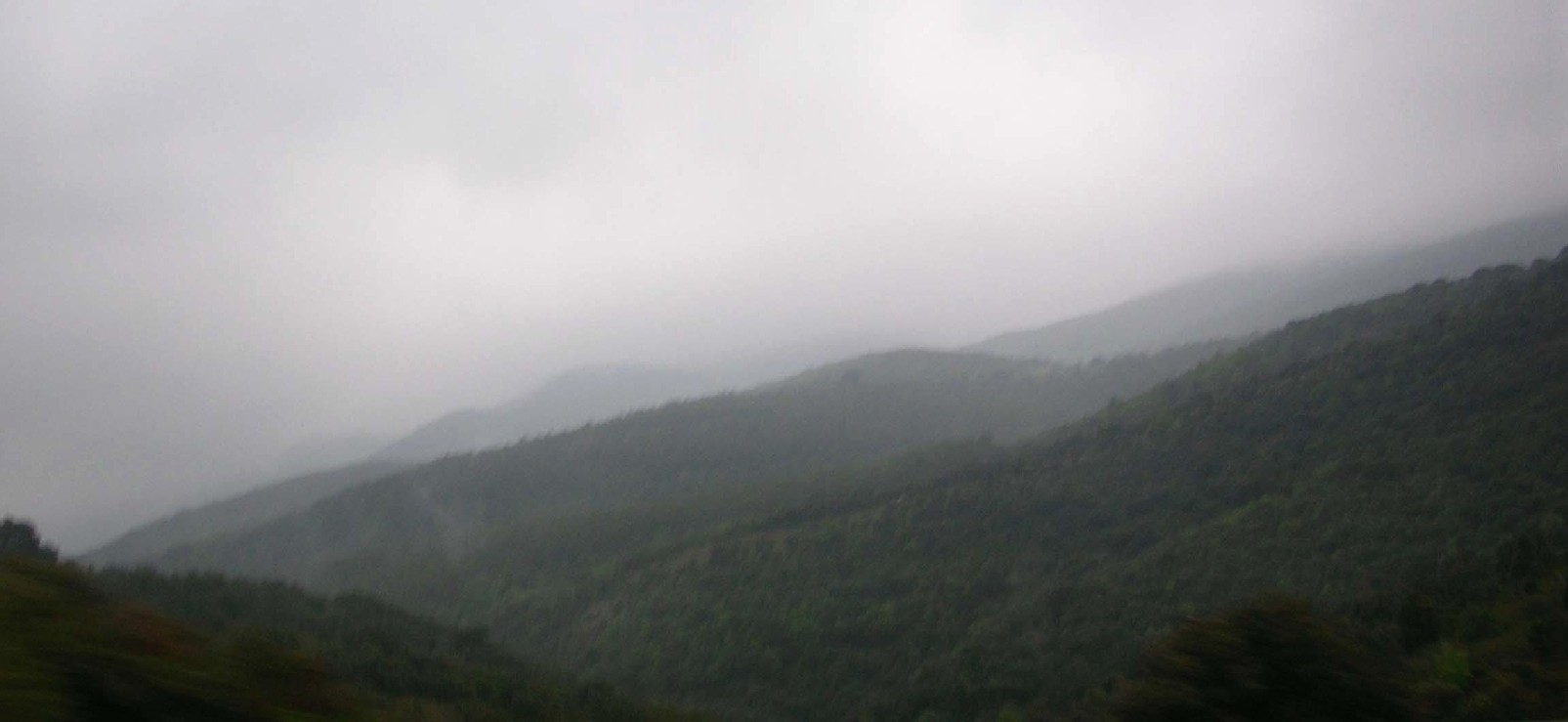
- View of the range during a storm in the winter

Highest point
- Peak: Muixacre
- Elevation: 1,275 m (4,183 ft)
- Listing: List of mountains in the Valencian Community
- Coordinates: 40°31′48″N 0°2′2″E

Dimensions
- Length: 14 km (8.7 mi) WNW/ESE
- Width: 3 km (1.9 mi) NNE/SSW

Geography
- Location within Spain
- Location: Alt Maestrat & Baix Maestrat, Valencian Community
- Parent range: Iberian System, eastern end

Geology
- Rock type: Karstic

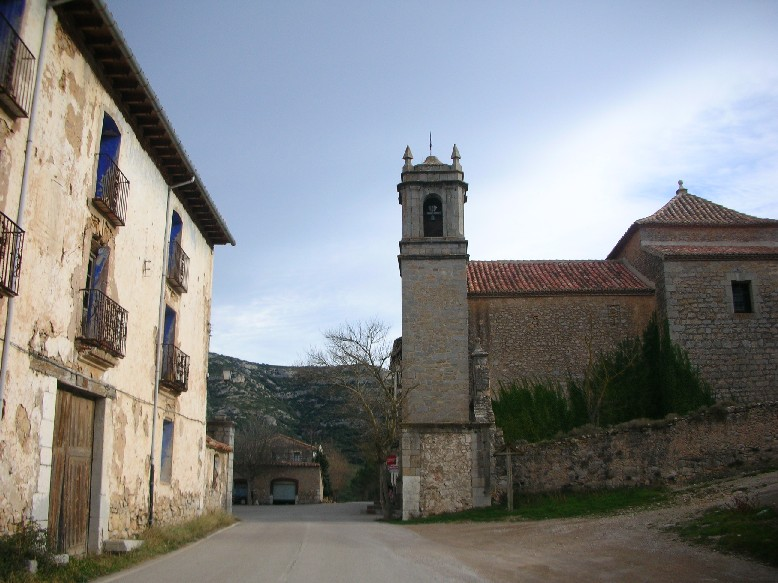
The church of Vallivana and an abandoned house

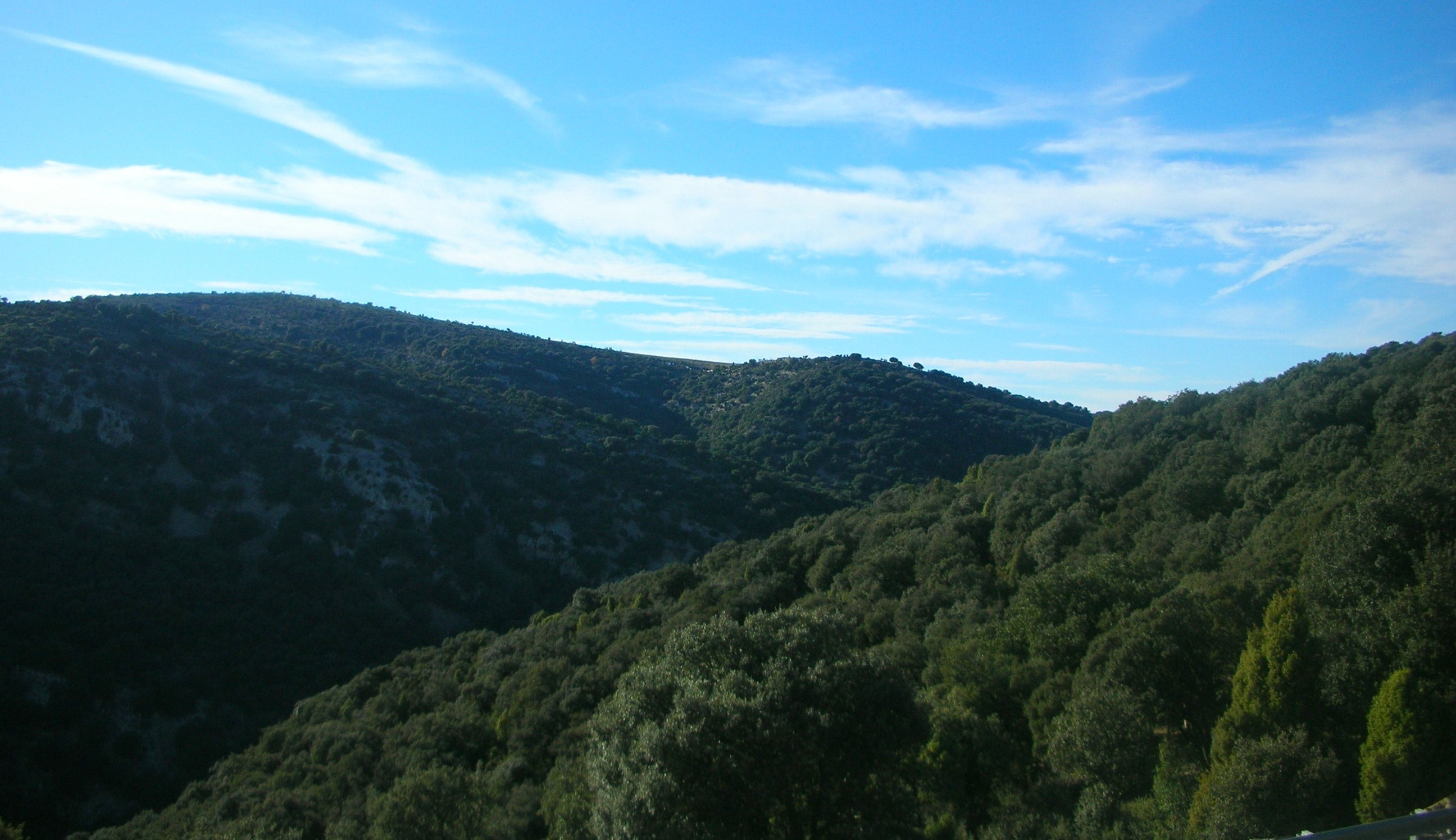
View of the Serra de Vallivana from the Port de Querol

Serra de Vallivana (Valencian pronunciation: [ˈsɛra ðe vaʎiˈvana], Spanish: Sierra de Vallivana) or Muntanyes de Vallivana is an over 14 km (9 mi) long mountain range straddling the Alt Maestrat and Baix Maestrat comarcas, Valencian Community, Spain.

== Geography ==
The highest point of the range is the 1,275 m high Muixacre, located close to the Port de Querol mountain pass in the N-232 road. Other important peaks are Montserrat and Talaió. These mountains are frequently covered in snow in the winter.

This mountain chain rises between the almost abandoned village of Vallivana and the top of the Maestrat mountains, south of the Serra del Turmell and west of the Serra de l'Espadella ranges. These mountains are named after the virgin of Vallivana, the patroness of Morella. The easiest route to reach the range is from Vallivana or from Morella

== Ecology ==
This sparsely populated mountain area has the most important forested zone of the region with large prey birds such as the griffon vulture and wild animals like Spanish ibex, roe deer and wild boar.

The area of this range together with the neighboring Tinença de Benifassà and Serra del Turmell was declared a Site of Community Importance by the European Union under the name Tinença de Benifassà, Turmell i Vallivana.

== See also ==
- Mountains of the Valencian Community
- Vallivana
- Maestrat/Maestrazgo
- List of Sites of Community Importance in Spain
