= Xert =

- Municipality
- Coat of arms

- Location in Spain
- Coordinates: 40°31′16″N 0°9′21″E
- Country: Spain
- Autonomous community: Valencian Community
- Province: Castellón
- Comarca: Baix Maestrat
- Judicial district: Vinaròs

Government
  - Alcalde: Fernando Beltrán Jovaní (2007) (PP)

Area
  - Total: 82.51 km^{2} (31.86 sq mi)
- Elevation: 470 m (1,540 ft)

Population (2025-01-01)
  - Total: 702
  - Density: 8.51/km^{2} (22.0/sq mi)
- Demonym(s): Xertolí, Xertolina
- Time zone: UTC+1 (CET)
  - Summer (DST): UTC+2 (CEST)
- Postal code: 12360
- Official language(s): Valencian
- Website: Official website

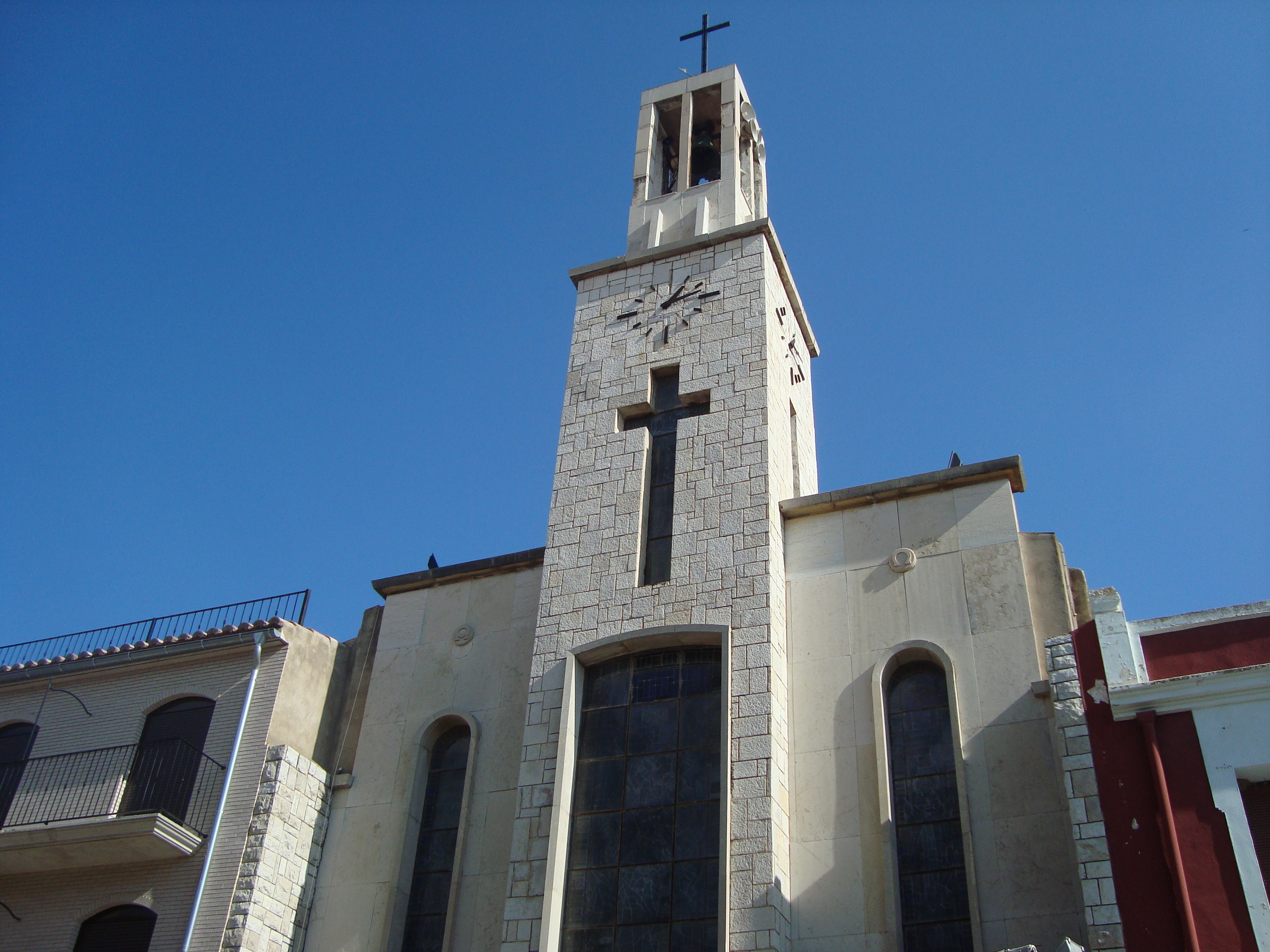
Campanar de la Església de Xert

Xert (Valencian pronunciation: [ˈtʃɛɾt]) is a municipality in the comarca of Baix Maestrat in the Valencian Community, Spain.

The mountains known as Moles de Xert rise above the town and are included in its administrative area.

== History ==
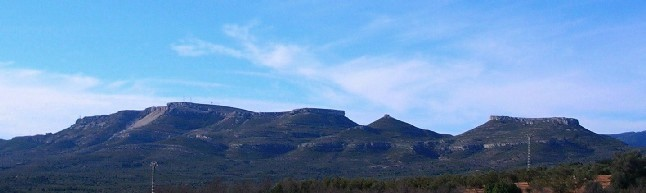
Moles de Xert

On the hill known as Mola Murada there are remains of an ancient Iberian village of the Bronze Age. During the time of the Umayyad conquest of Hispania Xert was a Saracene town depending from Cervera. After 1233 it was taken over by the Knights Hospitaller, then in 1319 the Order of Montesa took over until the 19th century saw the end of manorialism. In 1836 there were pitched battles between Carlists and Liberals in the mountain areas near Xert.

In the past Xert had its own lligallo in order to organize cattle herding in its area. The village of La Barcella was abandoned in 1609 and Fontanals during the time of the Spanish Maquis in mid 20th century.

== Villages ==
- Enroig, 51
- La Barcella, 0
- Fontanals, 0
