= N-232 road (Spain) =

Road in Spain

Coordinates: 40°28′28″N 0°25′57″E

National road N-232
- Carretera nacional N-232
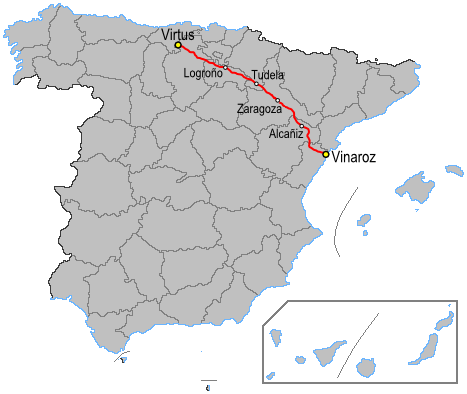

Route information
- Length: 561.5 km (348.9 mi)

Major junctions
- From: Vinaròs
- To: Cabañas de Virtus, (Burgos)

Location
- Country: Spain

Highway system
- Highways in Spain; Autopistas and autovías; National Roads

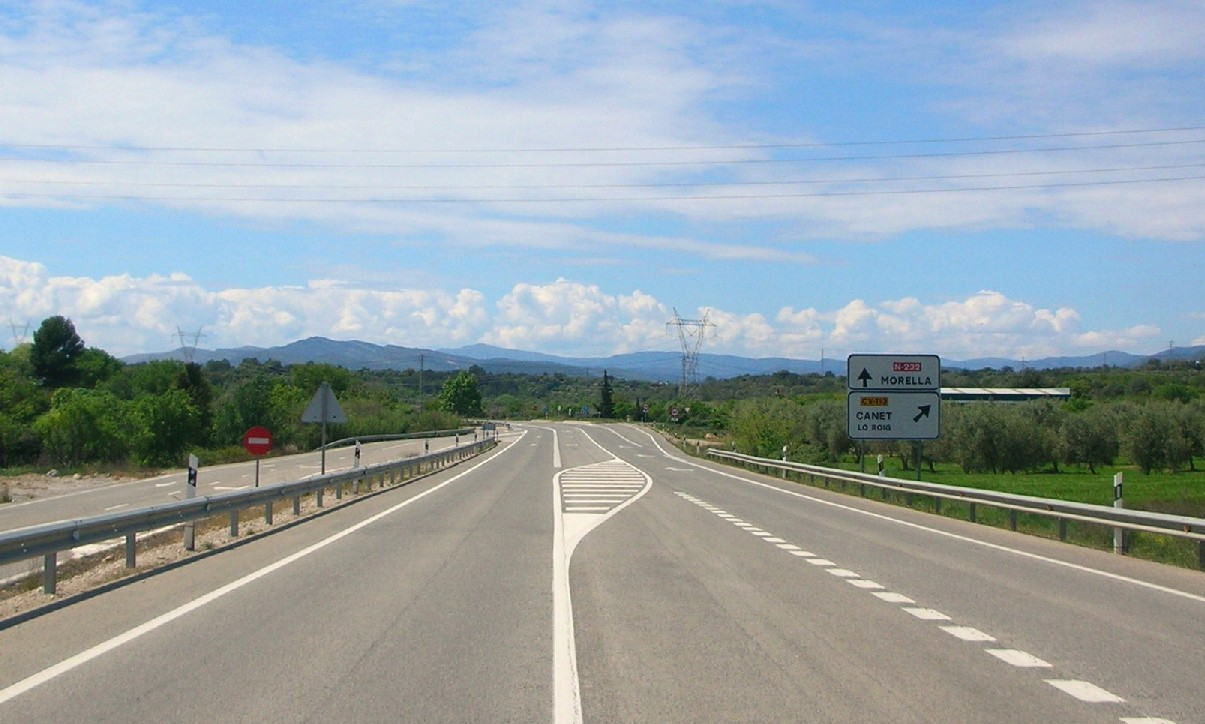
N-232 road near La Jana with the Serra de Vallivana and Serra del Turmell in the background.

The N-232 is a highway in Spain. It broadly follows the Rio Ebro from Logroño to the coast. It starts south east of Logroño at the Autovía LO-20 and runs parallel to the Autopista AP-68. The road passes Calahorra before it junctions with the N-113, N-121 and Autovía A-15.

The road passes Tudela and thereafter has been upgraded to Autovía status. 30 km to the south east is a junction with the N-122. The road then enters Zaragoza. There are also junctions with the N-330 and Autovía A-2 or Autovía A-23.

The road then continues south east between the Rio Ebro and the Imperial Channel of Aragon. The AVE also crosses the road. The road leaves the valley to the south, passing Iberian ruins and the Momumento al Tambor before reaching Alcañiz. Here it crosses the N-211 and Rio Guadalope. The N-420 continues north east, passing over the Coll del Moro to Tarragona.

The N-232 itself heads south through the mountains of El Maestrat. The road is at parts narrow and dangerous. It passes the Hermitage de la Consolación before the Port Torre Miró (1,259m). The road turns east after the town of Morella, going into the Serra de Vallivana and Serra del Turmell over the Port de Querol. The road follows the valley of the Rambla de Cervera and ends at the N-340 at Vinaròs 15 km north of Peníscola.

== See also ==
- Vallivana
