= Morella, Spain =

Morella
- Municipality
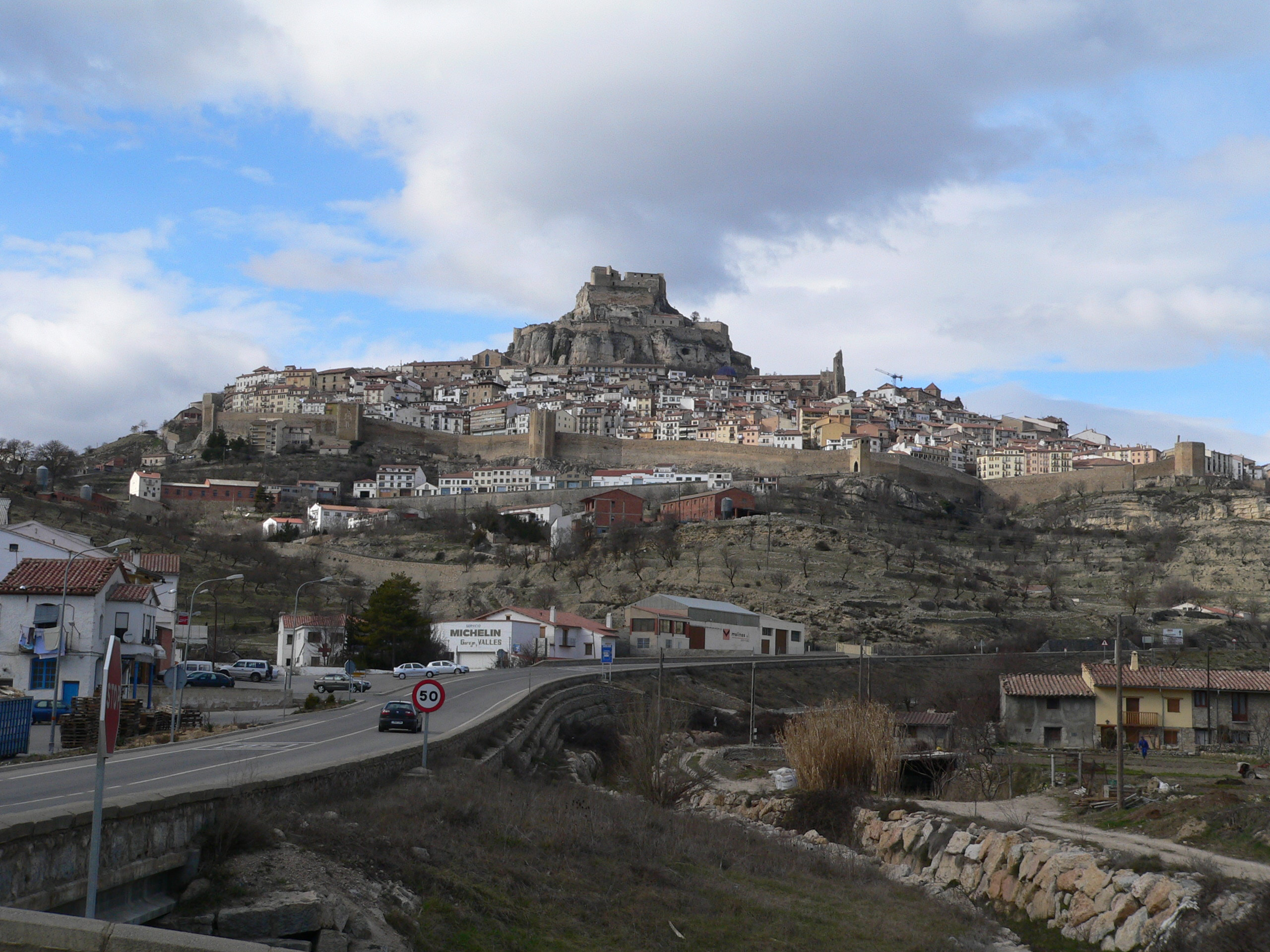

- Coat of arms
- Location of Morella
- Location within Valencian Community Location within Spain
- Coordinates: 40°37′10.60″N 0°06′06.20″W
- Country: Spain
- Autonomous community: Valencian Community
- Province: Castelló / Castellón
- Comarca: Els Ports

Government
  - Alcalde: Bernabé Sangüesa (Independents per Morella)

Area
  - Total: 413.5 km^{2} (159.7 sq mi)
- Elevation: 984 m (3,228 ft)

Population (2025-01-01)
  - Total: 2,501
  - Density: 6.048/km^{2} (15.67/sq mi)
- Demonym(s): Morellan • morellà, -ana (Val.) • morellano, -ana (Sp.)
- Time zone: UTC+1 (CET)
  - Summer (DST): UTC+2 (CEST)
- Official language(s): Valencian; Spanish
- Website: www.morella.net/

Spanish Cultural Heritage
- Type: Non-movable
- Criteria: Historic ensemble
- Designated: 28 October 1965
- Reference no.: RI-53-0000067
- Morella is in the heart of the historic region of Maestrazgo

Morella (Valencian: [moˈɾeʎa]) is an ancient walled city located on a hill-top in the province of Castellón, Valencian Community, Spain. The town is the capital and administrative centre of the comarca of Els Ports, in the historic Maestrat (Maestrazgo) region.

There are traces of settlement by the Iberians, succeeded by the Greeks and Romans, Visigoths and the Moors. From the early 17th century to the Spanish Civil War, the town was often fought over, due to its strategic situation between the Ebro and the coastal plain of Valencia. Morella is part of the Taula del Sénia free association of municipalities.

Every six years the citizens celebrate the Sexenni, a commemoration of the town's recovery from the plague in the seventeenth century. Tourism now plays an important part in the local economy, along with agriculture. In the 20th century the town and surrounding area became depopulated, a trend that has only been reversed in the early 21st century. The population of Morella at the start of 2019 was 2,430, having declined from a figure of 7,335 in 1900 (INE).

One of the typical gastronomic products of Morella is sweets known as flaons. Local bakeries are also renowned for a number of other traditional pastries and sweets, like mantecadas, prepared in the ancient way.

== History ==
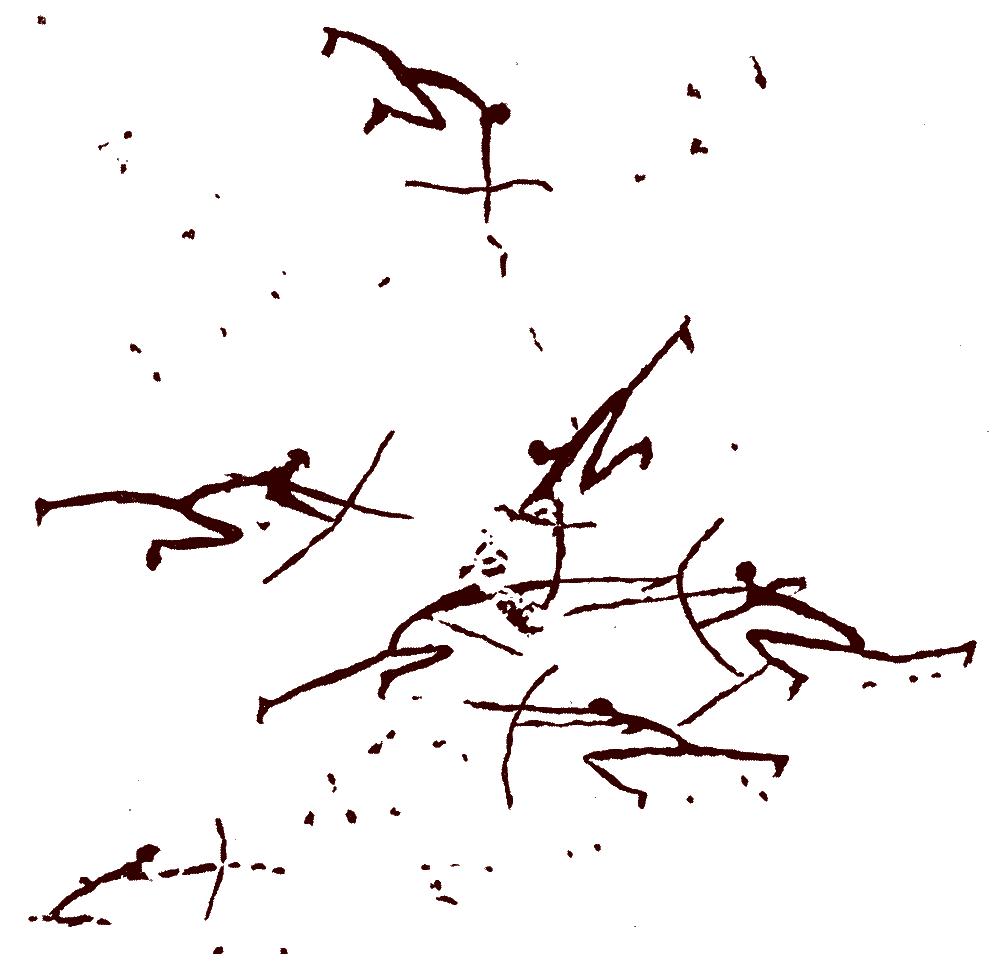
This cave painting in Galeria del Roure, in Morella la Vella, is the oldest depiction of archery combat.

Prehistoric remains in the area include cave paintings in Galeria del Roure, in Morella la Vella, famous for the oldest known depiction of archery combat.

The ancient Greeks established a treasury at Morella, but then the area became the scene of conflict between the Carthaginians and the Roman Empire during the Punic Wars. Eventually the town was Romanized and became part of the province of Tarragona. The Visigoths populated the city in two different epochs, there are ruins of a Visigoth village in the site of Mas Sabater-Cantera de la Parreta de Morella. There are the remains of a building from the 7th century A.D., which according to the archaeologists could have been twelve meters high and maybe it was a noble building or maybe of religious use according to Ramiro Pérez, one of the directors of the excavation.

The Moors took the town in 714, naming it Maurela.

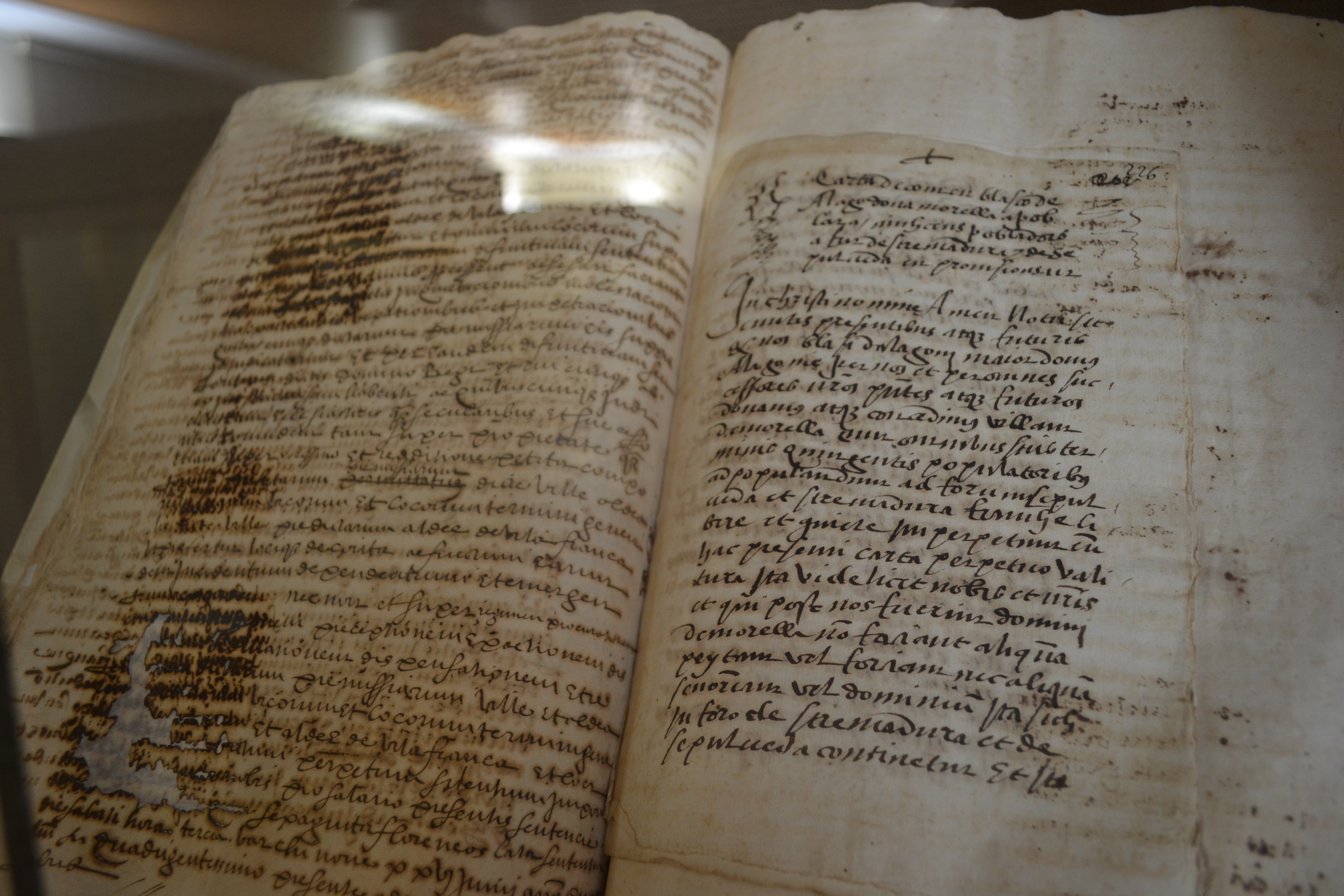
Municipal charter of Morella (1233).

El Cid is reputed to have rebuilt the castle which dominates the town and in 1084 he is supposed to have fought in the service of Yusuf al-Mu'taman ibn Hud and defeated Sancho Ramírez of Aragon at the Battle of Morella. In 1117, Sancho captured Morella, but it was recaptured by the Moors and only finally subdued by Blasco de Alagon in 1232. Following Blasco's death in 1239, James I of Aragon established a royal garrison in the city and awarded the inhabitants the title of "Faithful".

Morella sided with Philip V during the War of the Spanish Succession in the early eighteenth century and became the centre of a military and political district. During the Napoleonic Wars, the citizens rose up against the invading forces and the town was finally captured for Spain in 1813 by Francisco Javier de Elío. In the Carlist Wars of the nineteenth century Morella became the headquarters of the forces of Ramon Cabrera.

The town was captured by forces of General Franco in April 1938, towards the end of the Spanish Civil War. Republican guerillas held out in the surrounding mountains until 1956.

In the 1960s and 70s many people left the town for work opportunities in the cities and many of the local small industries died, but a slow revitalization has taken place since the transition of Spain to democracy.

== Sexenni ==
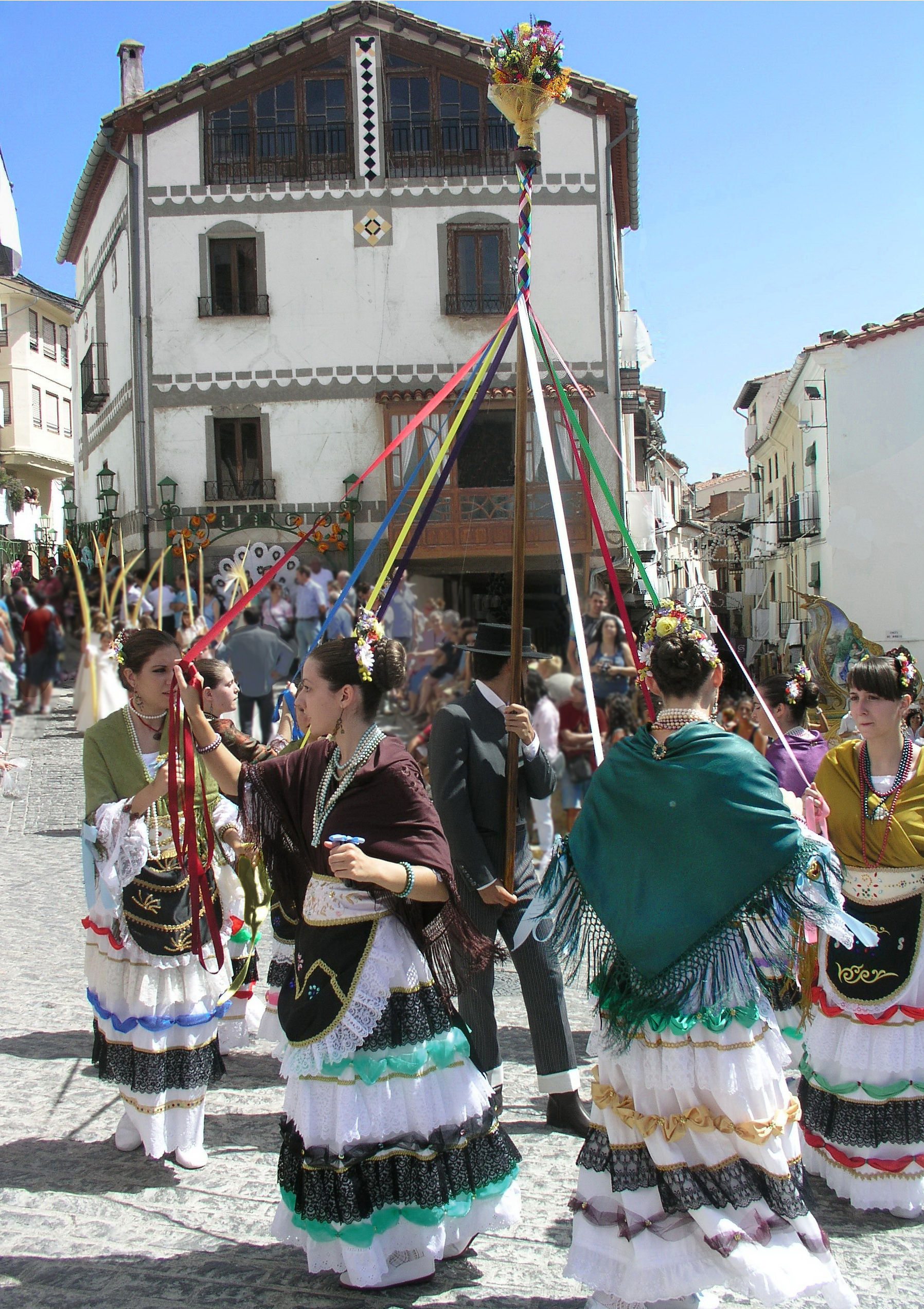
Dance of Gitanetes, Sexenni 2012. Morella

In the late seventeenth century, Morella was severely affected by the plague. After twenty years of suffering, the citizens brought a statue of the Virgin Mary from the Sanctuary of Vallivana, 24 kilometres (15 mi) away, at the feet of the Serra de Vallivana range, and processed it through the streets. It is said that the plague disappeared from the city and, to remember this, every six years the Sexenni festival takes place for nine days in late August. The virgin is carried in procession and the traditional town guilds perform ancient dances in her honour. The festivities in 2006 were the first of the 21st century.

== Municipal area ==
Denes of Morella

Morella's municipal area is divided into subdivisions known since ancient times as Dena. These are: La Vespa, Els Castellons, Dena Primera del Riu, Dena Segona del Riu, La Font d'en Torres, Herbeset, Els Llivis, Morella la Vella, El Coll i el Moll, La Pobla d'Alcolea, Dena de la Roca, Muixacre, Herbeset, Xiva de Morella, Hortells and Vallivana.

== Geography ==
Morella occupies a strategic position between the plains of the river Ebro to the north west and the coastal plains of Valencia and Castellon. Access from the north west lies through the passes of Torre Miró 1,259 metres (4,131 ft) and Querol 1,020 metres (3,350 ft). The old town is completely enclosed by 2.5 kilometres (1.6 mi) of ancient stone walls, pierced at seven points by gates or portals. The river Bergantes skirts the southern boundaries of the town as it descends towards the Guadalope which ultimately joins the Ebro.

=== Climate ===
Morella has an Oceanic climate (Köppen: Cfb) highly influenced by its altitude around 1,000 metres (3,300 ft) and its well inland location, with warm summers and cool winters (cold for Spanish standards) with frequent frosts and snow. Temperatures as low as −10 °C (14 °F) and heavy snowfalls can happen during harsh cold spells. The highest temperature ever recorded in Morella was 40 °C (104 °F) on 16 August 1925, while the coldest temperature recorded was −17 °C (1 °F) on 17 December 1933.

The average temperature in Morella during 1916-2020 has been 12.8 °C (55.0 °F), with an average rainfall of 645 millimetres (25.4 in) and 15 snowy days on average. The annual sunshine hours are around 2500−2600.

Climate data for Morella (1943-1969)
Month	Jan	Feb	Mar	Apr	May	Jun	Jul	Aug	Sep	Oct	Nov	Dec	Year
Mean daily maximum °C (°F)	7.3 (45.1)	8.5 (47.3)	10.9 (51.6)	13.9 (57.0)	18.6 (65.5)	22.7 (72.9)	26.3 (79.3)	26.0 (78.8)	22.4 (72.3)	16.2 (61.2)	11.5 (52.7)	7.7 (45.9)	16.0 (60.8)
Daily mean °C (°F)	3.6 (38.5)	4.5 (40.1)	6.5 (43.7)	9.1 (48.4)	13.4 (56.1)	17.1 (62.8)	20.3 (68.5)	20.4 (68.7)	17.2 (63.0)	12.0 (53.6)	7.7 (45.9)	4.4 (39.9)	11.3 (52.3)
Mean daily minimum °C (°F)	−0.2 (31.6)	0.6 (33.1)	2.1 (35.8)	4.3 (39.7)	8.2 (46.8)	11.5 (52.7)	14.3 (57.7)	14.7 (58.5)	12.0 (53.6)	7.9 (46.2)	3.9 (39.0)	1.1 (34.0)	6.7 (44.1)
Average precipitation mm (inches)	30 (1.2)	31 (1.2)	41 (1.6)	41 (1.6)	78 (3.1)	53 (2.1)	42 (1.7)	36 (1.4)	57 (2.2)	80 (3.1)	53 (2.1)	57 (2.2)	600 (23.6)
Source: Sistema de Clasificación Bioclimática Mundial (Global Bio Climatics)

== Today ==
Morella is now a tourist destination, with many historic buildings, hotels and restaurants. It is listed as one of the most beautiful towns in Spain. Some of the top sights to see in Morella are the Castillo de Morella (Morella Castle), the aqueduct, Iglesia de Santa María (Saint Mary's Church), Convent de San Francesc (St. Francis’ Convent) both in Gothic style, the Temps de Dinosaures Museum (Time of Dinosaurs Museum), and the Visigoth settlement from the 7th century (Mas Sabater-Cantera la Parreta).

Although not as important as in the past, wool and woollen goods still plays a part in the local economy. One of its most famous products is the Morella blanket, which has a unique design, with a range of colour combinations and horizontal stripes. Agriculture, especially poultry and pig production are important in the surrounding area with craft products and highly valued black truffles which are traded at seasonal markets during the winter.

== Notable people ==
- Antonio Royo Marín (1913–2005), Spanish Dominican priest and theologian
- Ximo Puig (born 1967), Spanish politician (PSPV-PSOE) President of the Generalitat Valenciana (2015–2023).

== Gallery ==
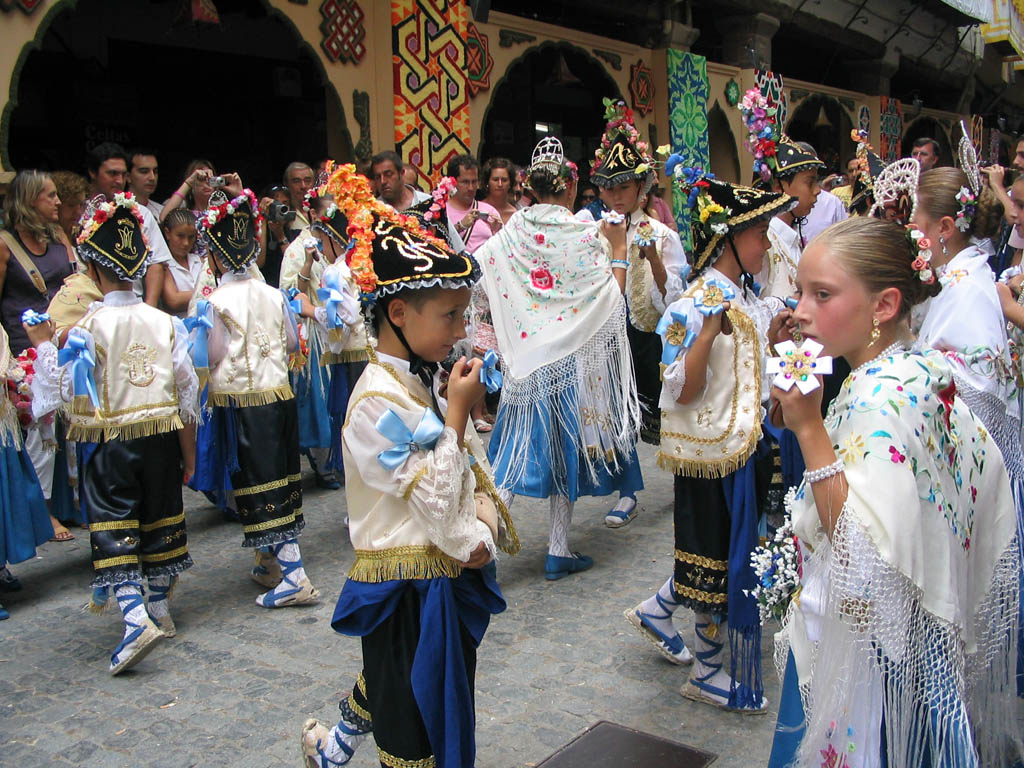
Dance of the Llauradors, Sexenni, Morella 2006

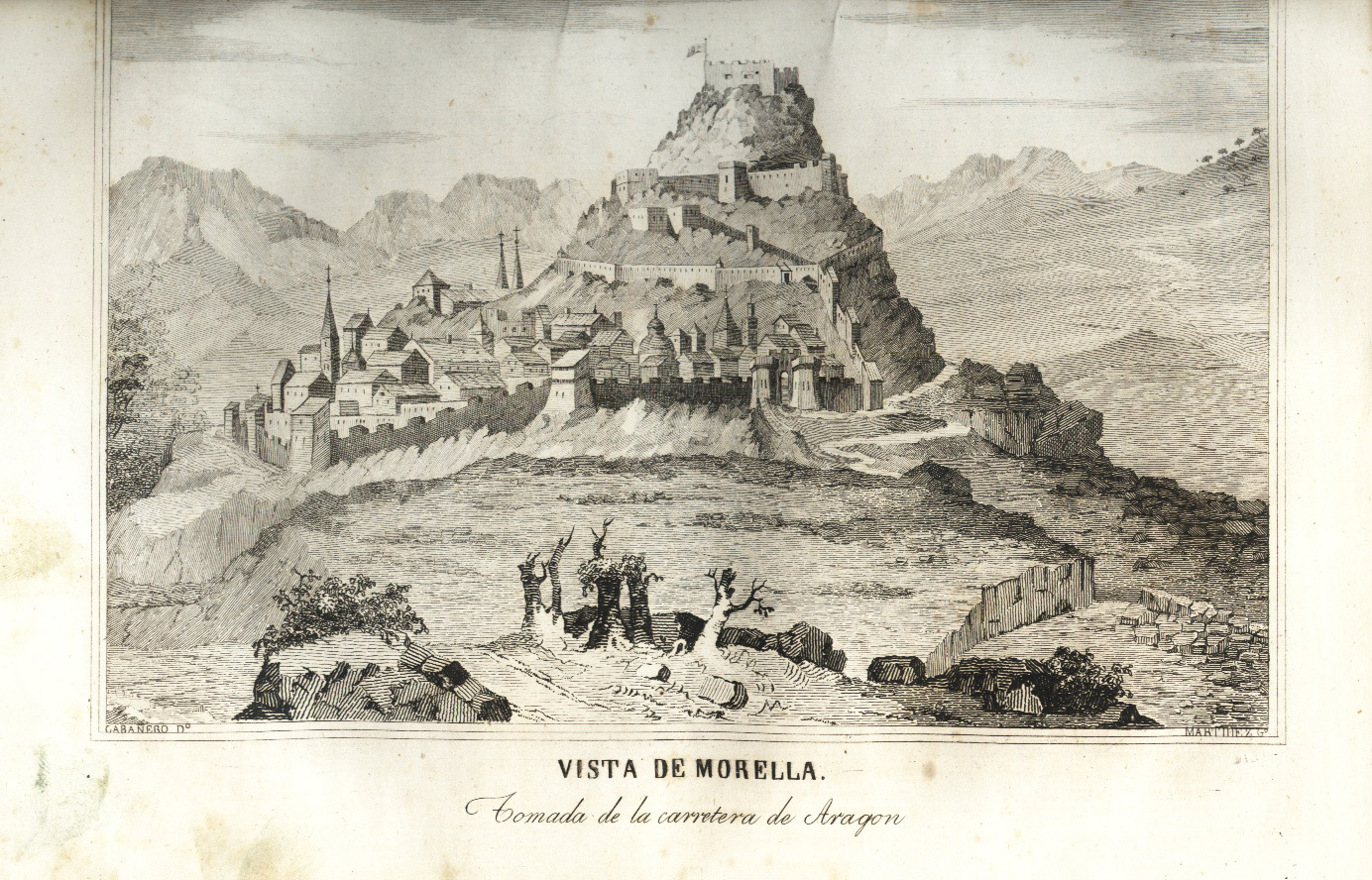
Morella in 1845

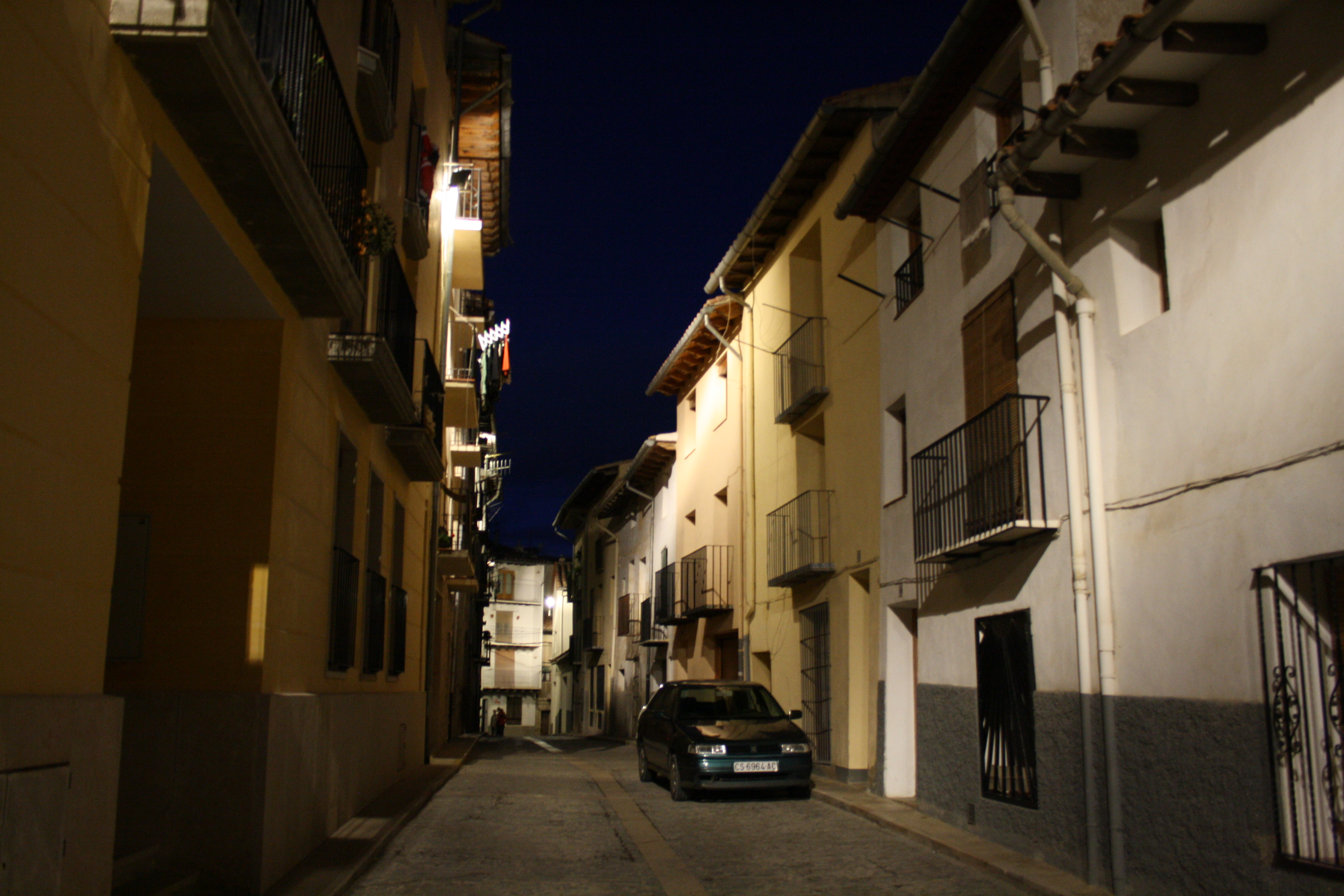
Street in Morella

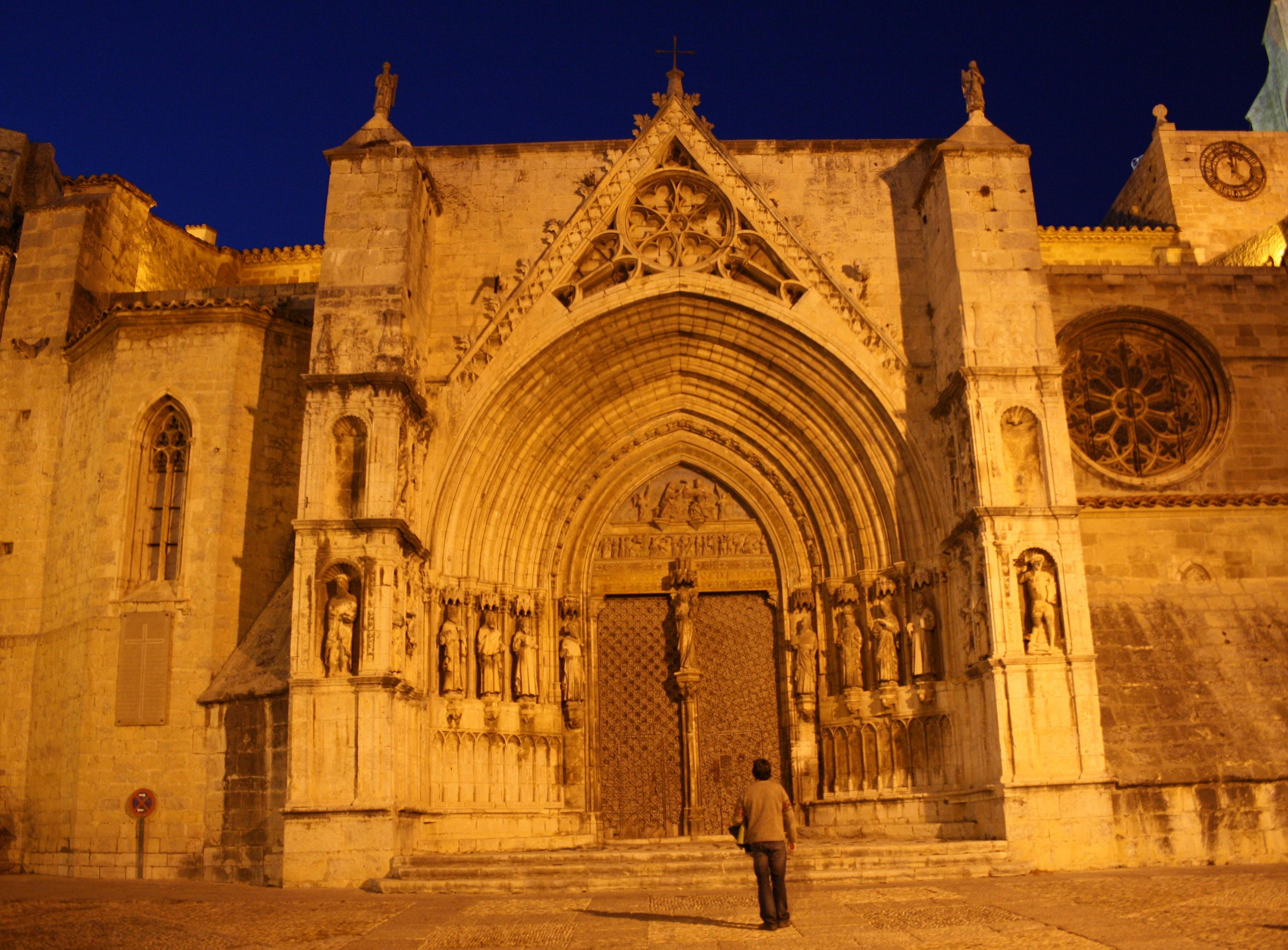
Gate of the Church Santa María la Mayor

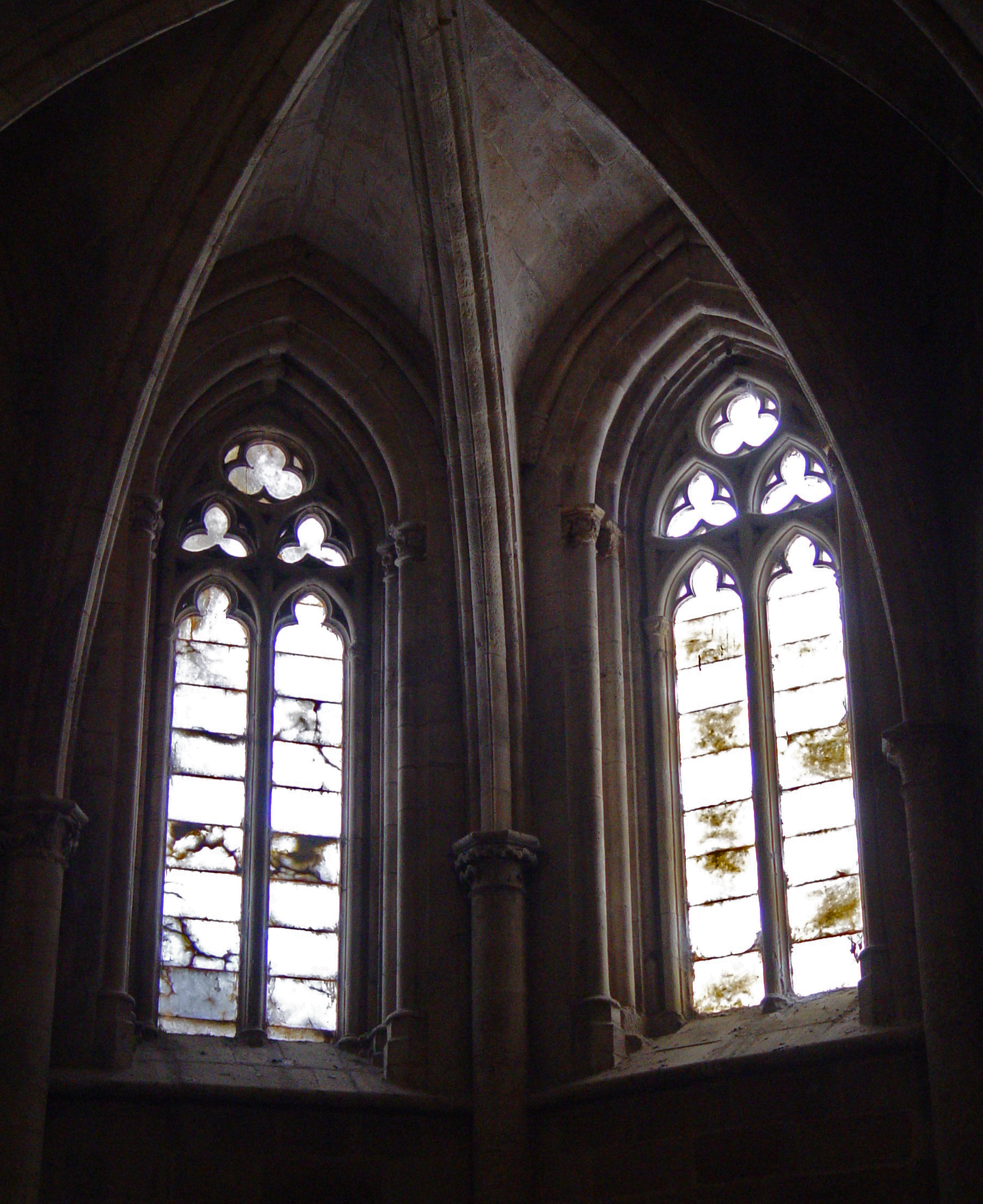
Alabaster windows in Santa Maria La Major church

== See also ==
- Ports (comarca)
- Ports de Morella
- Maestrat
- Vallivana
