= N-211 road (Spain) =

National road N-211
- Carretera nacional N-211

Major junctions
- From: Autovía A-2
- To: Alcañiz

Location
- Country: Spain

Highway system
- Highways in Spain; Autopistas and autovías; National Roads

The N-211 is a highway in Aragon, Spain. It connects the Autovía A-2 between Alcolea del Pinar and Fraga through Monreal del Campo, Alcañiz and Caspe, communicating Madrid with Catalonia. It is an alternative route for N-II/A-2.

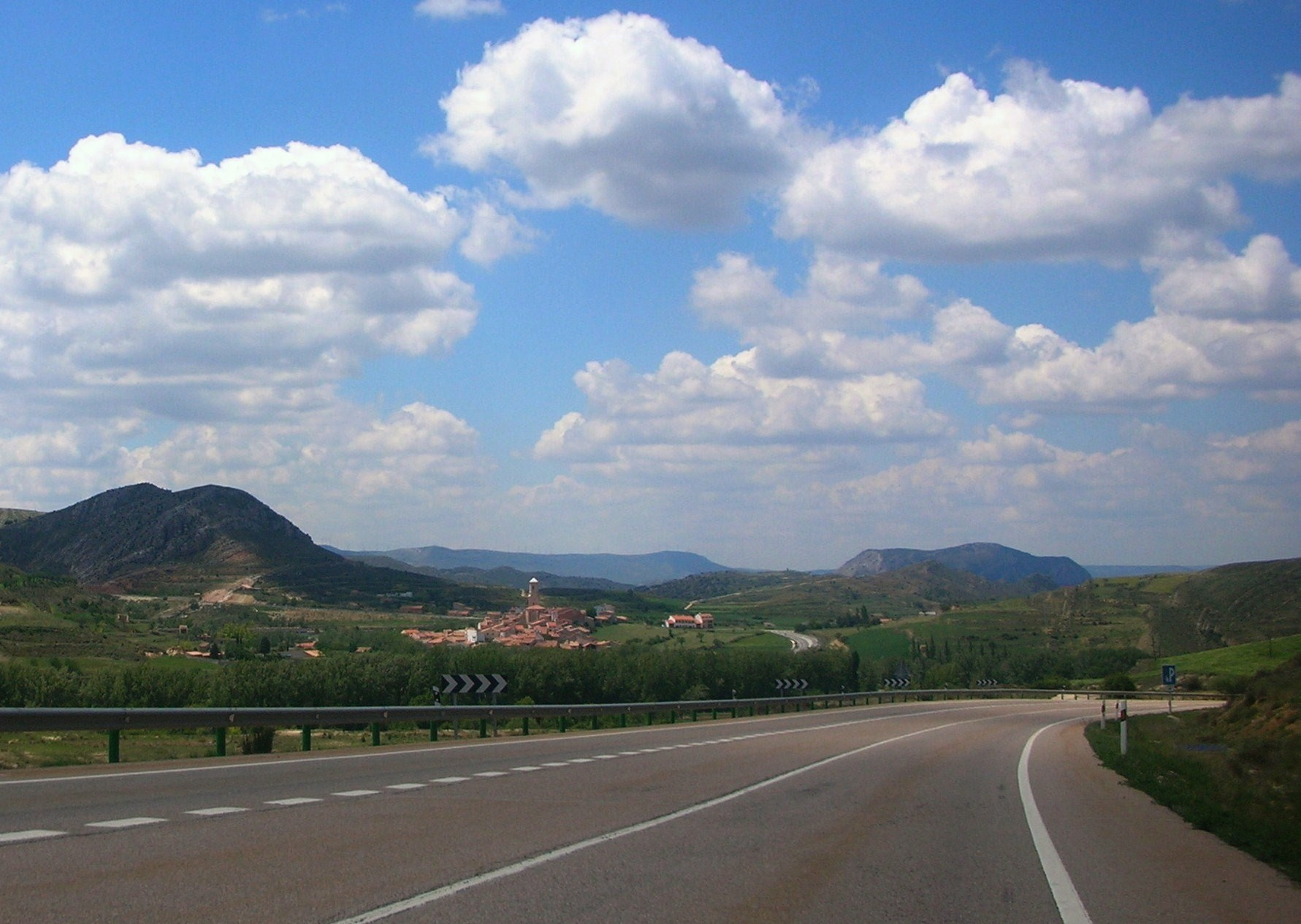
N-211 road with Castel de Cabra town and the Sierra de San Just mountains in the background

There have been demands that this highway be widened and upgraded to Autovía status in certain stretches, mainly between Guadalajara and Teruel.

The central stretch of this highway, between Molina de Aragón and Calanda, runs through the mountainous areas of the Sistema Ibérico range.

== Main towns and mountain passes ==
- Alcolea del Pinar A-2
- Maranchón
- Mazarete
- Anquela del Ducado
- Molina de Aragón
- Castellar de la Muela
- El Pobo de Dueñas
- Pozuel del Campo
- Monreal del Campo A-23
- Caminreal
- Vivel del Río Martín
- Martín del Río
- Montalbán N-420
- Castel de Cabra
- Puerto de las Traviesas 1180 m
- Cañizar del Olivar/La Zoma/
- Venta de la Pintada A-1702
- Gargallo
- La Mata de los Olmos
- Los Olmos
- Alcorisa
- Calanda
- Alcañiz N-232
- Caspe
- Mequinenza
- Torrente de Cinca
- Fraga N-II A-2 AP-2

== See also ==
- Autovía A-2
