= Equestrian statue of Francisco Franco =

Removed instance of public art

Statue of Francisco Franco
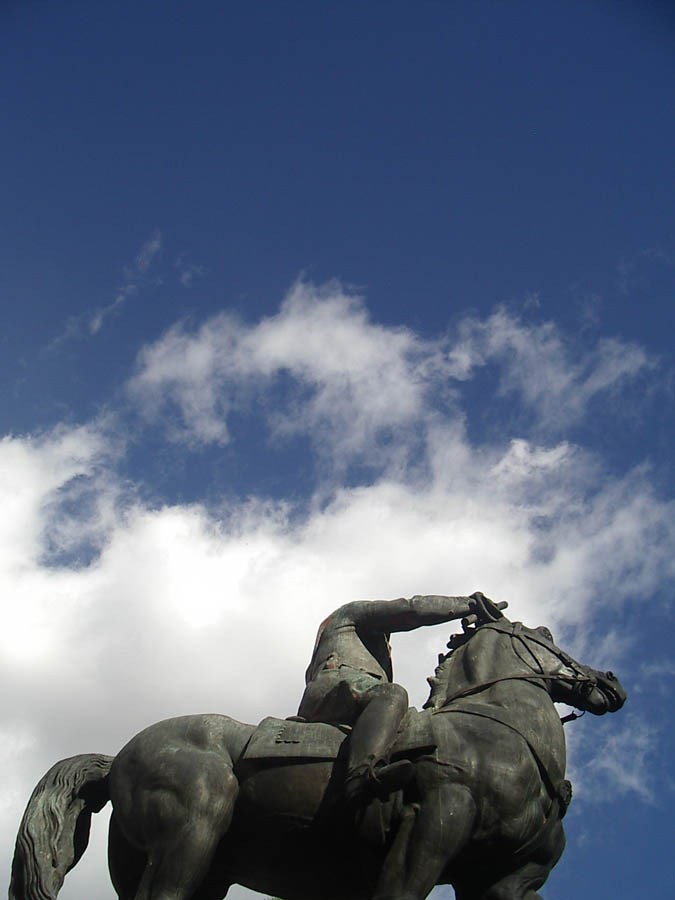
- Location: Nuevos Ministerios, Madrid, Spain
- Coordinates: 40.441678°N 3.693663°W
- Designer: José Capuz
- Material: Bronze, stone
- Height: 7.5 m
- Completion date: 1956
- Opening date: 18 July 1959
- Dedicated to: Francisco Franco
- Dismantled date: 17 March 2005

The equestrian statue of Francisco Franco was an instance of public art in Madrid, Spain. The statue, depicting dictator Francisco Franco riding a horse, was removed from its location in Nuevos Ministerios and subsequently stored in March 2005.

== History and description ==
A work by José Capuz, the bronze was cast in 1956. The sculptor reportedly found inspiration in the Donatello's equestrian statue of Gattamelata. Initially intended to top the Arco de la Victoria, following the refusal of Franco to have his equestrian statue put on the triumphal arch, the Complutense University of Madrid donated the statue to the Ministry of Housing. Transferred to plaza de San Juan de la Cruz, next to the Nuevos Ministerios, it was unveiled on 18 July 1959. The statue spawned two replicas, sent to Santander and Valencia's respective plazas del Generalísimo.

The ensemble had a total height of 7.5 m.

Over the years, the monument became a meeting point of Francoists every 20 November, while it also became the target for tagging carried out by left-wing sympathizers. Meanwhile the different public administrations denied ownership of the statue and therefore they avoided responsibility for its withdrawal.

In the early morning of 17 March 2005, employees of the Tragsa company upon request of the Subsecretariat of the Ministry of Public Works removed the statue from the plinth during an operative that took some hours. It was reportedly a decision of Minister Magdalena Álvarez. The Mayor of Madrid, Alberto Ruiz-Gallardón, told he was not aware of the intentions of the ministry regarding the fate of the statue.

The statue was stored in ministerial premises located in the calle de Gregorio Benítez.

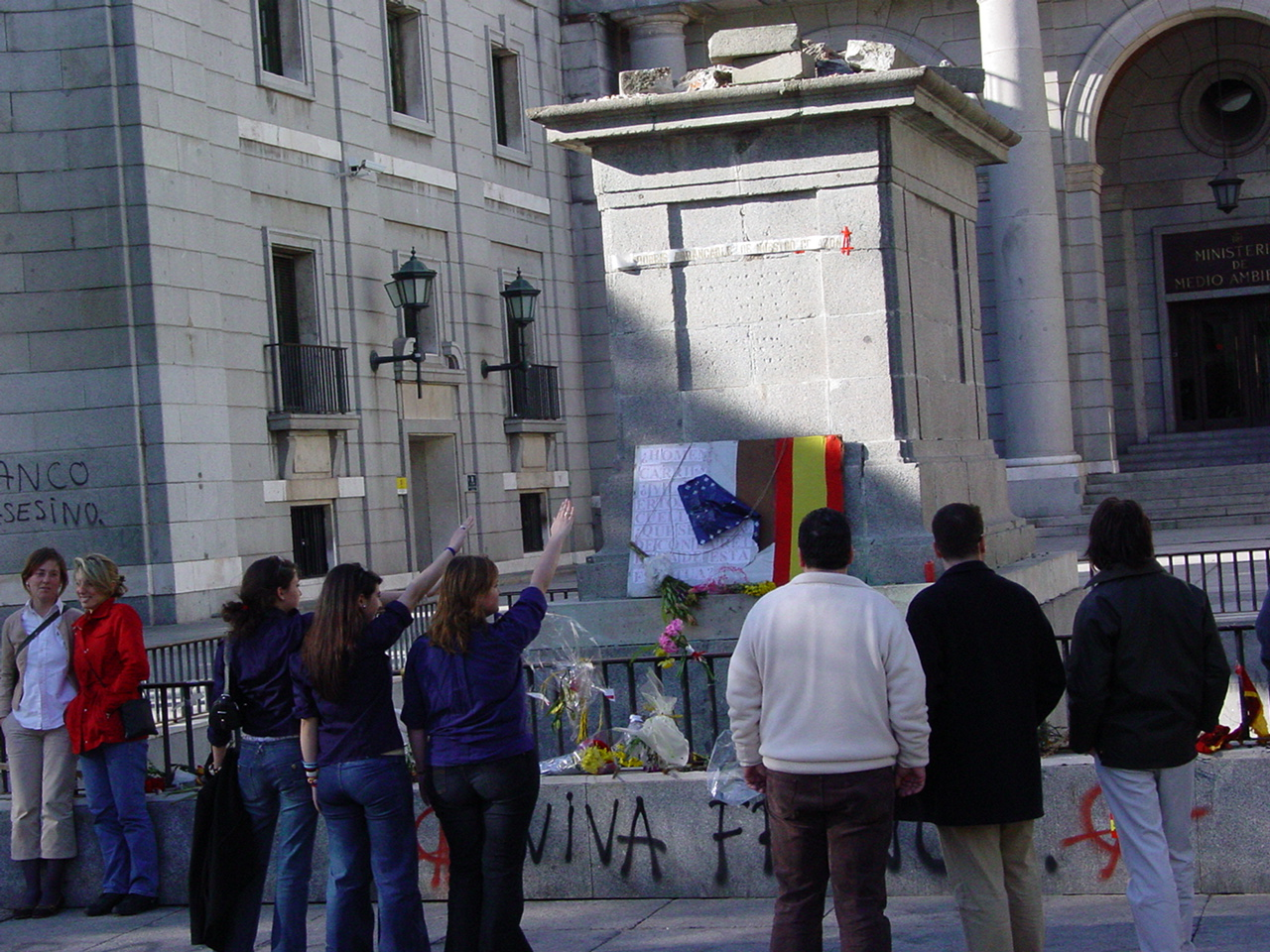
Group of Francoists performing the fascist salute before the empty plinth in March 2005

The day after the removal a group of 700 far-right militants—including Blas Piñar—gathered around the empty pedestal to give a farewell to Franco, singing a Hail Mary and the Cara al Sol, also inveighing against the Government of Spain, the People's Party, and, most acrimoniously, against José Luis Rodríguez Zapatero and Santiago Carrillo, while also trying to vandalise the nearby statues of Indalecio Prieto and Largo Caballero. The police proceeded then to break up the rally.

Soon after the removal, the conservative newspaper ABC published an editorial arguing that "it would be dangerous for socialism to fall into the revanchist temptation to try to claim back now, retroactively, part of a cession it made thirty years ago in a Spain that is not the Spain of the past and which, fortunately, has stripped itself of all the ghosts of the past." Meanwhile, former Francoist honcho José Utrera Molina—from the platform La Razón granted him—wrote against the removal of statues, arguing that "Franco still rides serene and majestic in the air of history". Vandal attacks against the statue of Largo Caballero still ensued in the days following the removal.

The only remaining element of the monument still on-site, the 3-metre high stone plinth, was retired by August 2006.

After the events, one individual and the Francisco Franco National Foundation (FNFF) filed for an administrative lawsuit intending to litigate against the removal. In 2009, the Higher Court of Justice of Madrid determined that the Ministry of Public Works had bypassed the historical heritage law, yet the Court also ruled out enforcing the reposition as it would violate the Law of Historical Memory.
