= Castel de Cabra =

- municipality
- Coat of arms

- Location within Spain
- Coordinates: 40°48′N 0°42′W
- Country: Spain
- Autonomous community: Aragon
- Province: Teruel
- Municipality: Castel de Cabra

Area
  - Total: 29.44 km^{2} (11.37 sq mi)
- Elevation: 1,088 m (3,570 ft)

Population (2025-01-01)
  - Total: 79
  - Density: 2.7/km^{2} (7.0/sq mi)
- Time zone: UTC+1 (CET)
  - Summer (DST): UTC+2 (CEST)

Castel de Cabra is a municipality in Cuencas Mineras, province of Teruel, Aragon, Spain. According to the 2010 census the municipality has a population of 140 inhabitants. Its postal code is 44706.

The town is located on the northern side of Sierra de San Just. Road N-211 crosses Castel de Cabra.

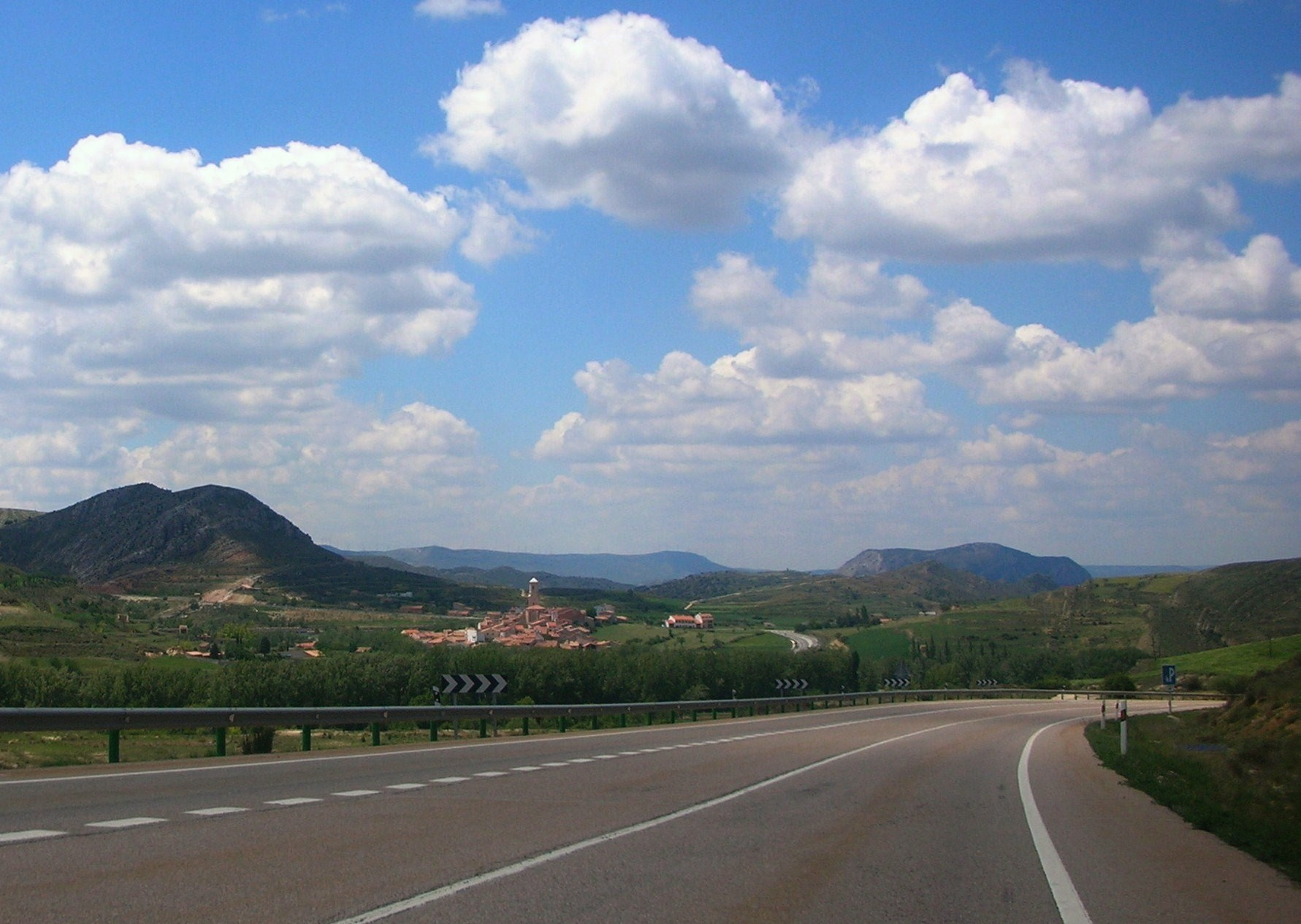
N-211 road with Castel de Cabra town and the Sierra de San Just mountains in the background

== See also ==
- Cuencas Mineras
- List of municipalities in Teruel
