= Andorra-Sierra de Arcos =

Administrative area in Aragon, Spain

Coordinates: 40°59′N 0°27′W

- Comarca
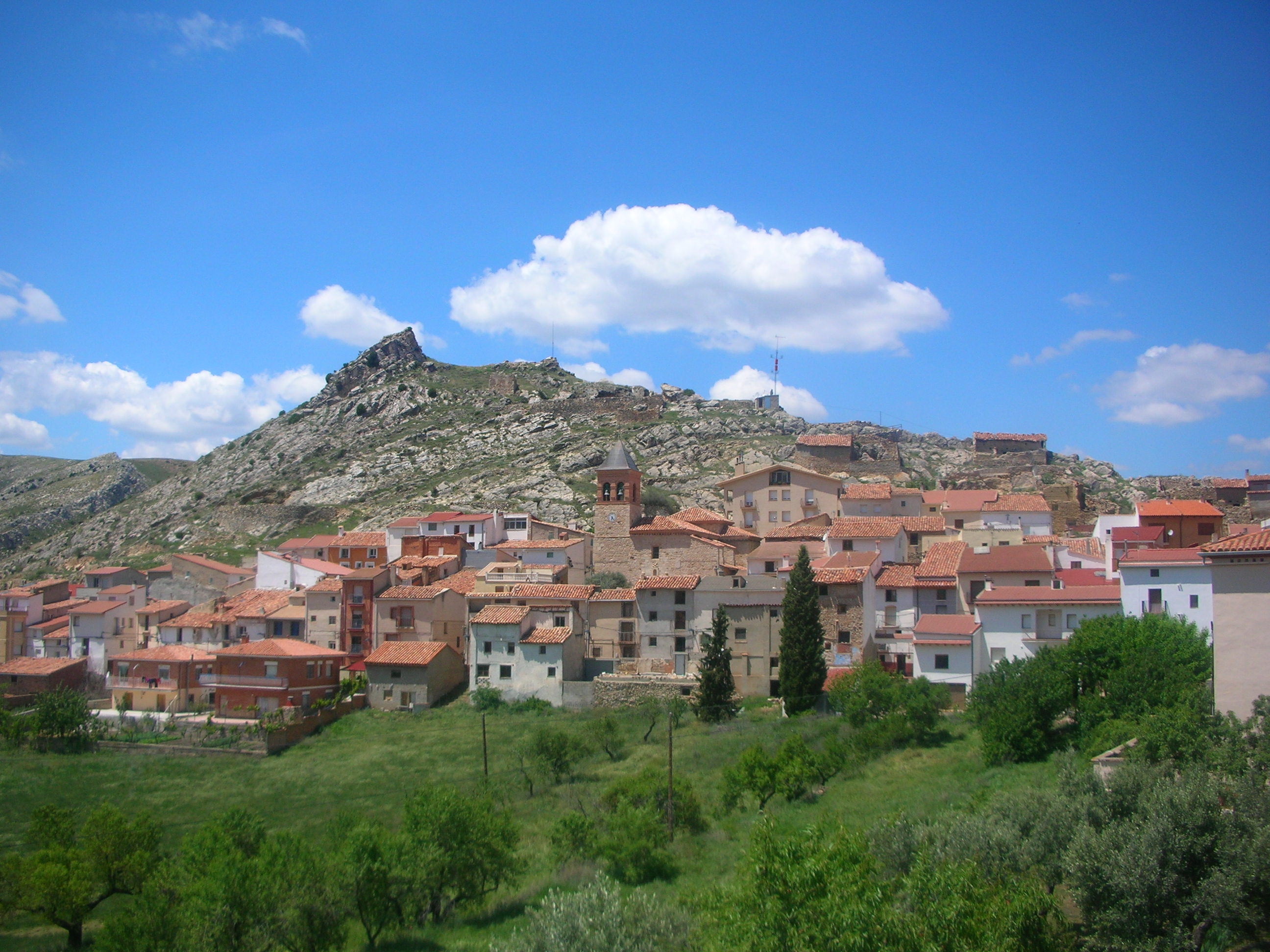
- View of Gargallo in Andorra-Sierra de Arcos comarca, located atop of one of the Sierra de San Just ridges

- Country: Spain
- Autonomous community: Aragon
- Province: Teruel

Area
  - Total: 675.1 km^{2} (260.7 sq mi)

Population (2009)
  - Total: 11.165
  - Density: 17.1/km^{2} (44/sq mi)
- Time zone: UTC+1 (CET)
  - Summer (DST): UTC+2 (CEST)
- Largest municipality: Andorra

Andorra-Sierra de Arcos is a comarca in Aragon, Spain. It is located in Teruel Province and it is named after Sierra de Arcos, a range of this mountainous area of the Sistema Ibérico. The capital is Andorra, with 7,335 inhabitants at the 2021 Census making it the largest town of the comarca.

Like neighboring Cuencas Mineras, this comarca is part of a traditional mining area. Owing to the unspoilt, spectacular mountain landscapes of the area, tourism is being developed.

Some municipal terms of Andorra-Sierra de Arcos are part of the historical region of Lower Aragon.

== Municipal terms ==
- Alacón
- Alloza
- Andorra
- Ariño
- Crivillén
- Ejulve
- Estercuel
- Gargallo
- Oliete

== See also ==
- Lower Aragon
