= Pablo Serrano =

Spanish abstract sculptor (1908–1985)

Personal details
- Born: Pablo Serrano Aguilar; 8 March 1908 Crivillén (Teruel), Spain
- Died: 26 November 1985 (aged 77) Madrid, Spain
- Profession: sculptor
- Website: http://www.pabloserrano.es/

Pablo Serrano Aguilar (8 March 1908, Crivillén, Teruel – 26 November 1985, Madrid) was a Spanish abstract sculptor.

== Personal life ==
1920–1925. Pablo Serrano studied as a boarder in the Escuelas Profesionales Salesianas in Sarriá (Barcelona). 1935–1954. He settled in Montevideo (Uruguay), Serrano had the opportunity to meet Joaquín Torres García and Lucio Fontana. 1955. Pablo Serrano was now to become a force within the Spanish artistic avant-garde. As evidence of this, in that same year, he won the III Biennial of Spanish American Art in Barcelona. 1957. His first solo exhibition was held at the Atheneum of Madrid. Together with Juana Francés and artists such as Manolo Millares, Manuel Rivera, and Antonio Saura he collaborated with El Paso Group. 1957–1958. The reflections that arose as a result of these series of pieces gave birth to a new project, which he christened Drama of the Object and Burning of the Object. In 1958, he exhibited in the Eduard Loeb Gallery in Paris and was invited to take part in the Art du XXI Siècle which was held in Charleroi, Belgium.

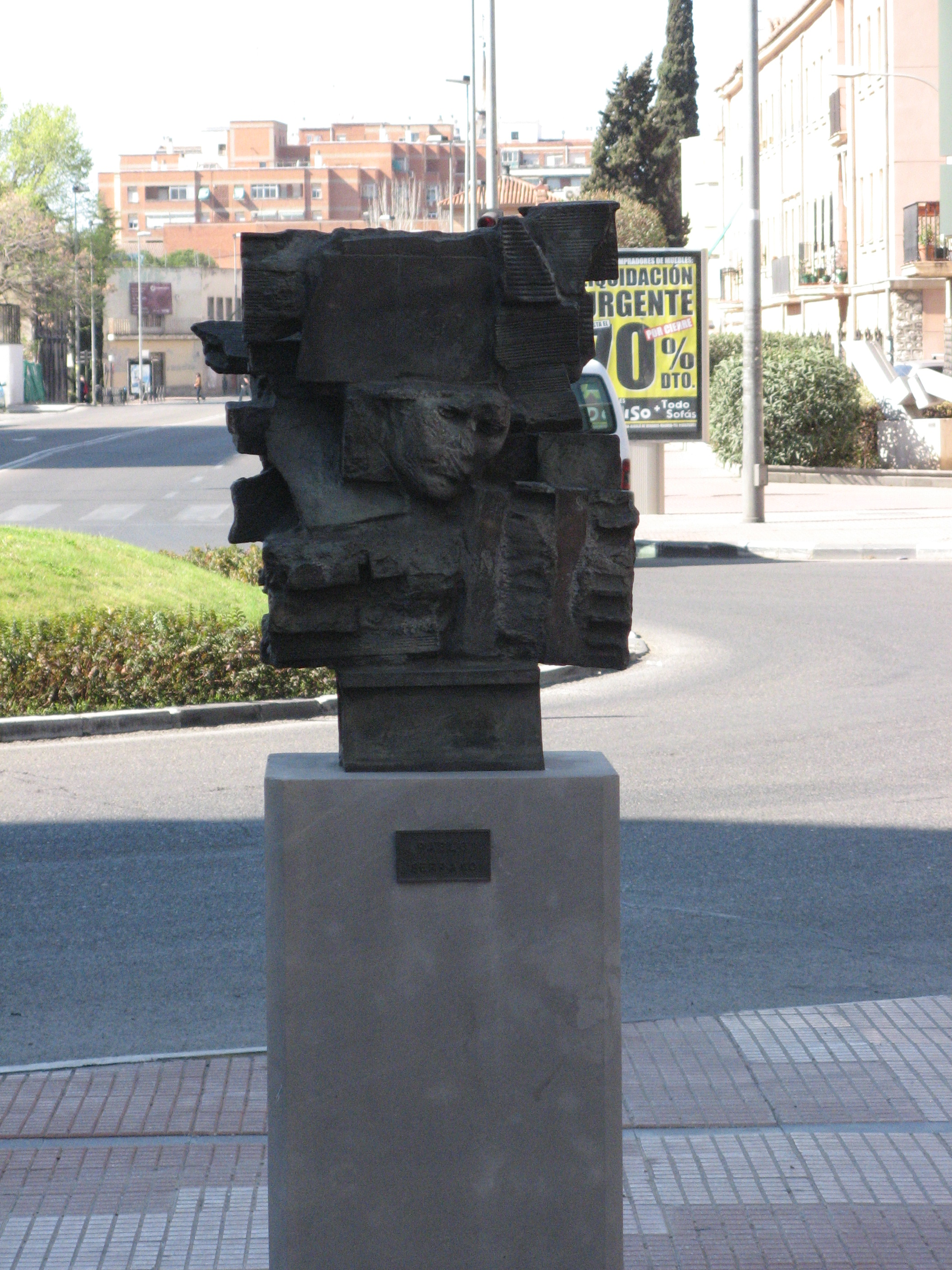
Work at the Museum of Outdoor Sculpture of Alcala de Henares.

Serrano's abstract introspection reached its zenith with the series Rhythms in Space, dynamic compositions constructed from stainless steel rods. In 1959, while taking part in one of Pierre Schaeffer's experimental music projects, Serrano presented his working models for these series, as well as the first Burning of an object entitled The Dis-occupation of the Space or the Presence of the Absence in the Galleria del Disegno in Milan, Italy.

1960. The reputation that he had by now firmly established lead him to be selected to take part in the New Spanish Painting and Sculpture exhibition that was on show for two years at first in MOMA in New York and later in Washington, Chicago and New Hampshire. He also took part in Current Art in Aschaffenburg, Germany.

Pablo Serrano was invited in 1961 to The Pittsburg International in the Carnegie Institute in the United States, and to the II Exposition Internationale de Sculpture Contemporaine in the Rodin Museum in Paris. He received the González Critics Prize in the Saloon of May in Barcelona.

He entered 23 pieces for the XXXI International Biennial in Venice in 1962, only to find himself a mere one vote short of the First Prize for Sculpture, which was to be won by Alberto Giacometti. 1967. Portrayal of Milton Rua. Concurrently, and in keeping with the aesthetic and philosophical line he had started at the beginning of the decade, he produced Men with Door, a logical continuation of his earlier Men-Vault. In this new period the character of Serrano's work became even more dichotomic. He participated in the Sculpture from Twenty Nations exhibition in the Guggenheim Museum in New York. 1969. The Juana Mordó Gallery in Madrid publishes Calvin Cannon's book Serrano in the Sixties. 1975. His sculptures were exposed in the Sala Gaudí Barcelona gallery, today Gaudifond Gallery, which collaborated exhibiting a sculpture in the famous La Rambla central Barcelona street and still owns several artworks of his. 1976. The series Yoke-Unit paved the way for the numerous sculptural projects like the piece entitled Spiritu mundi, Open Yoke-Unit sculpted for the University of Houston, Texas. 1982. That same year he was awarded the inaugural Príncipe de Asturias award for Art. Later he was to exhibit in the Hermitage Museum, in Leningrad. 1985. Serrano exhibited pieces from these last series at the Juana Mordó Gallery in Madrid, as well as their original plaster versions at the Guggenheim Museum in New York. Pablo Serrano died in Madrid on 26 November at the age of seventy seven. 1994. 27 May, the Foundation-Museum Pablo Serrano in Saragossa was officially opened.

== Open-air works ==
- Statue of Indalecio Prieto (Madrid)

== Work in museums ==
America

- Museum of Modern Art, New York City.
- Solomon R. Guggenheim Museum, New York City.
- Hirshhorn Museum and Sculpture Garden, Washington D.C.
- Brown University, Providence.
- Wadsworth Atheneum, Hartford, Connecticut.
- University of Houston–Clear Lake – Houston, Texas
- Indianapolis Museum of Art 'IMA', Indianapolis, Indiana
- Virginia Museum of Fine Arts, Richmond, Virginia
- University of Río Piedras, Puerto Rico.
- Ponce Museum, Puerto Rico.

Europe

- Museo Nacional Centro de Arte Reina Sofía, MNCARS, Madrid.
- Museo de Escultura al Aire Libre de Alcalá de Henares
- Centre Georges Pompidou, Paris.
- Musée National d’Art Moderne de la Ville de Paris.
- Galleria Nazionale d’Art Moderna, Roma.
- Galleria d’Arte Moderna, Venecia.
- Middelheim Museum, Antwerp.
- Calouste Gulbenkian Foundation, Lisboa.
- Hermitage Museum, Saint Petersburg.
- Pushkin Museum, Moscow.
- Stedelijk Museum, Amsterdam.
- Pablo Serrano Museum, Saragossa.

== See also ==
- Museo de Escultura al Aire Libre de Alcalá de Henares
