= Statue of Indalecio Prieto =

Statue in Madrid

Indalecio Prieto Tuero
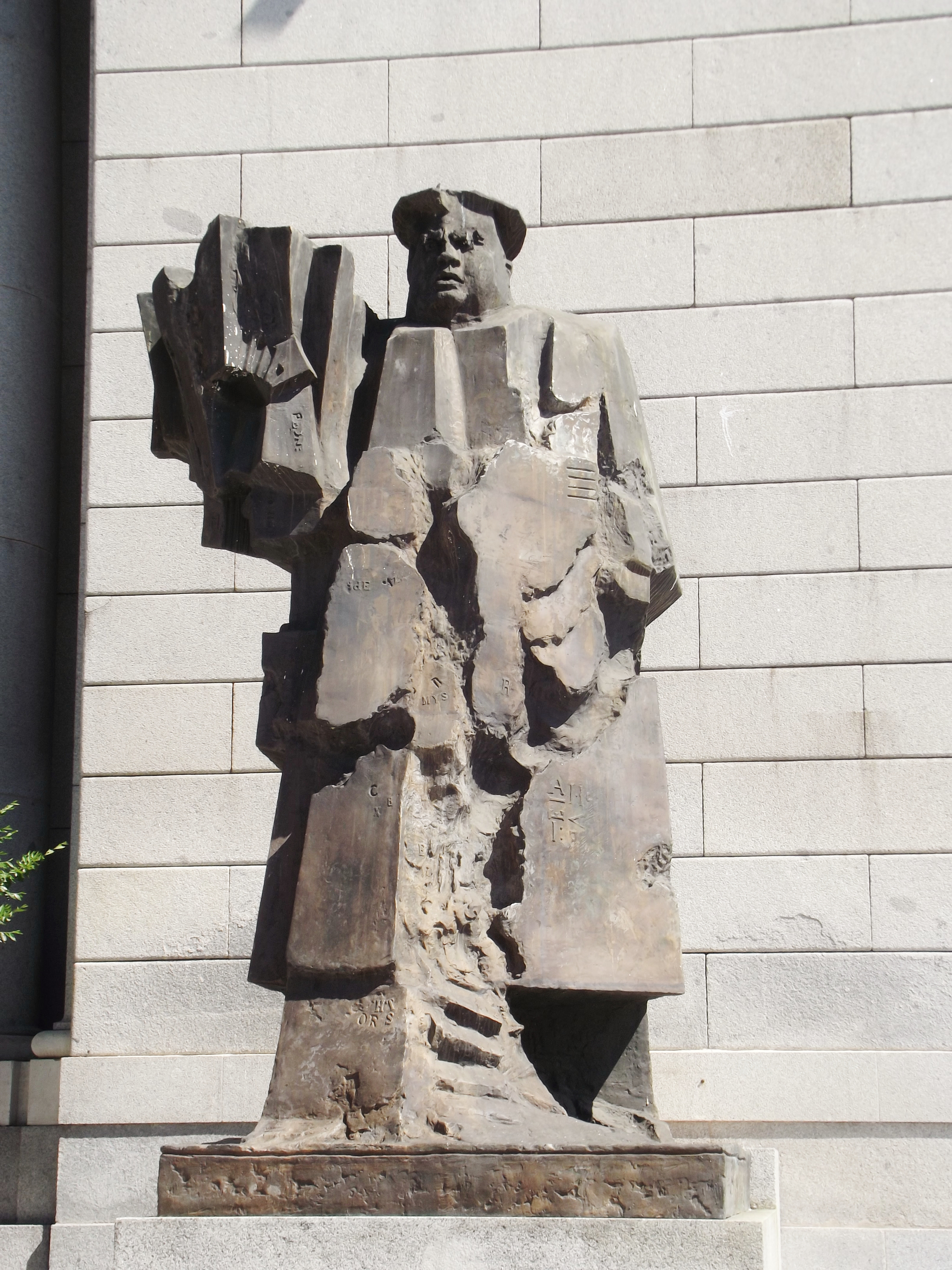
- 40.441793°N 3.69224°W
- Location: Nuevos Ministerios, Madrid, Spain
- Designer: Pablo Serrano
- Material: Bronze
- Height: > 4 m
- Opening date: December 1984
- Dedicated to: Indalecio Prieto

Indalecio Prieto Tuero or, simply, the Statue of Indalecio Prieto (Spanish: Estatua de Indalecio Prieto), is an instance of public art located in Madrid, Spain. Located next the Nuevos Ministerios building complex, it consists of a bronze statue depicting (and dedicated to) Indalecio Prieto, minister of Public Works during the Second Spanish Republic and promoter of the construction of the Nuevos Ministerios.

== History and description ==
The robust bronze statue, standing over 4 metre high, is a work by Pablo Serrano. The sculptor told he had found inspiration in the Spanish patriotism displayed by Prieto in his famous 1936 speech in Cuenca. It was unveiled in December 1984, during a ceremony attended, among others, by Enrique Barón, Joaquín Almunia and Julián Campo. The former minister is depicted wearing a Basque-style beret, and seemingly holds a bunch of books, reports and newspapers with his arm. It was, upon its inauguration, located steps away from an equestrian statue of dictator Francisco Franco, in opposing sides during the Spanish Civil War.

Following the removal of the nearby statue of Franco on 17 March 2005, the statue of Prieto was vandalised, with vandals painting the colours of the flag of Spain on the statue. Not long after, in July 2005, the statue was vandalised again, being tagged with a pink pigment.
