= Visiedo =

Visiedo, Spain
- municipality
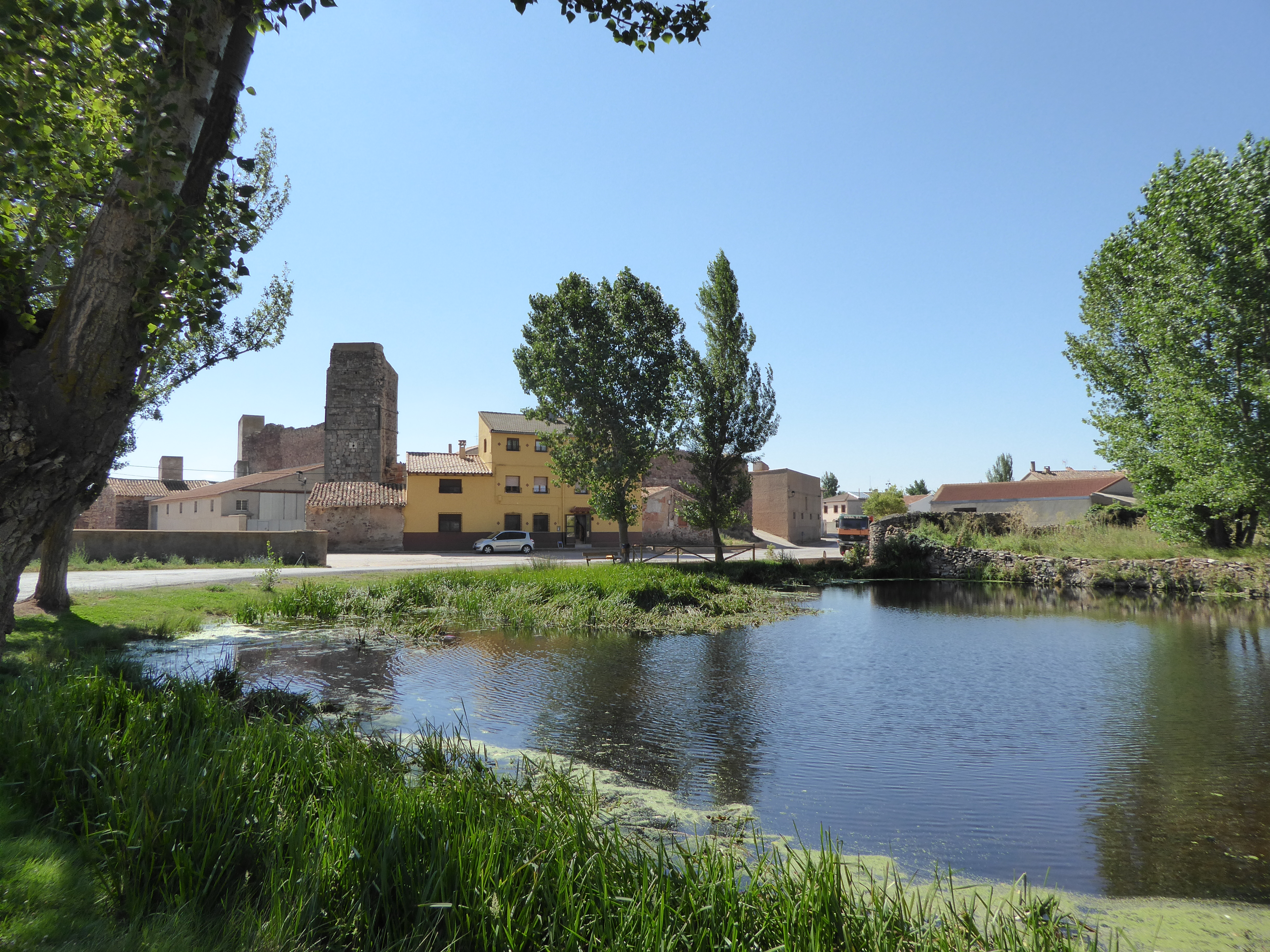

- Flag Coat of arms

- Location within Spain
- Coordinates: 40°41′N 1°6′W
- Country: Spain
- Autonomous community: Aragon
- Province: Teruel
- Municipality: Visiedo

Area
  - Total: 55.53 km^{2} (21.44 sq mi)
- Elevation: 1,185 m (3,888 ft)

Population (2025-01-01)
  - Total: 132
  - Density: 2.38/km^{2} (6.16/sq mi)
- Time zone: UTC+1 (CET)
  - Summer (DST): UTC+2 (CEST)

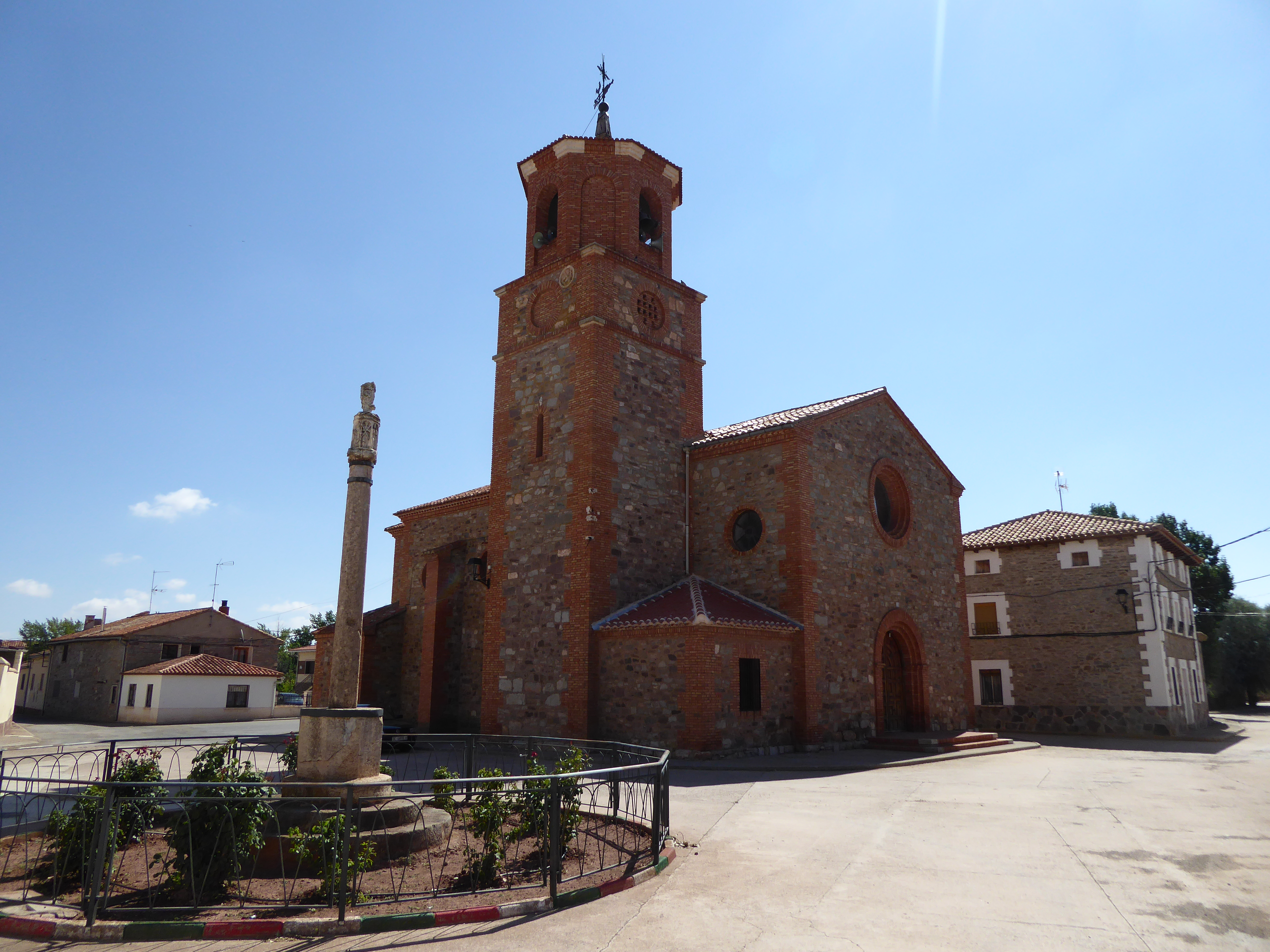

Visiedo is a municipality located in the province of Teruel, Aragon, Spain. According to the 2004 census (INE), the municipality had a population of 188 inhabitants.

The Plains of Visiedo (Spanish: Llanos de Visiedo) are part of the Sierra de San Just geographic area.

== See also ==
- List of municipalities in Teruel
