= Gargallo, Aragon =

Gargallo
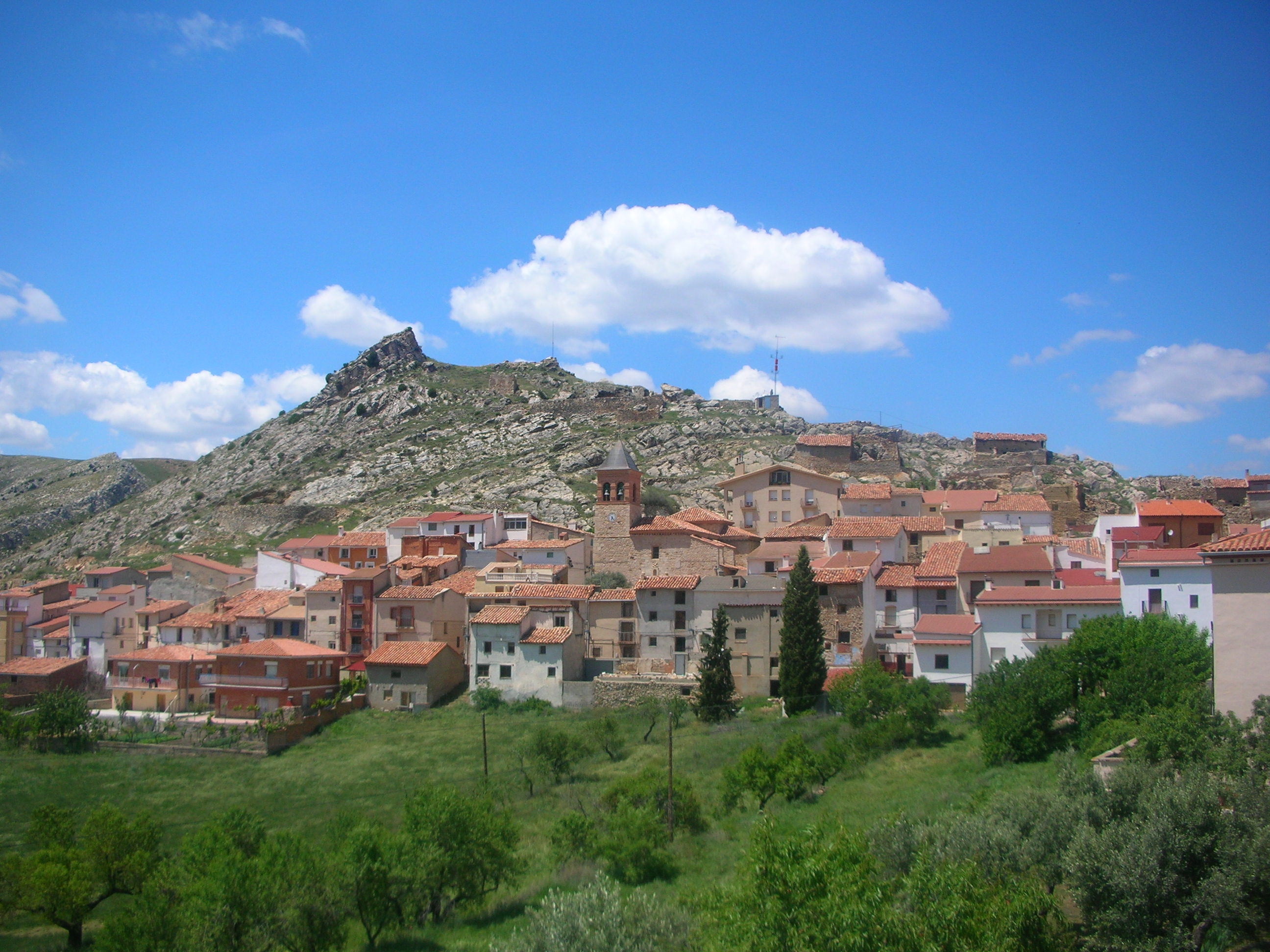

- Coat of arms

- Location within Spain
- Coordinates: 40°50′N 0°35′W
- Country: Spain
- Autonomous community: Aragon
- Province: Teruel
- Comarca: Andorra-Sierra de Arcos

Area
  - Total: 29.97 km^{2} (11.57 sq mi)
- Elevation: 941 m (3,087 ft)

Population (2025-01-01)
  - Total: 88
- Time zone: UTC+1 (CET)
  - Summer (DST): UTC+2 (CEST)

Gargallo is a municipality in Andorra-Sierra de Arcos comarca, province of Teruel, Aragon, Spain. According to the 2010 census the municipality has a population of 140 inhabitants. Its postal code is 44558.

It is located on a rocky ridge of the northern side of Sierra de San Just, part of the vast Iberian System. Road N-211 crosses the southern end of Gargallo.

== See also ==
- Andorra-Sierra de Arcos
- List of municipalities in Teruel
