= Crivillén =

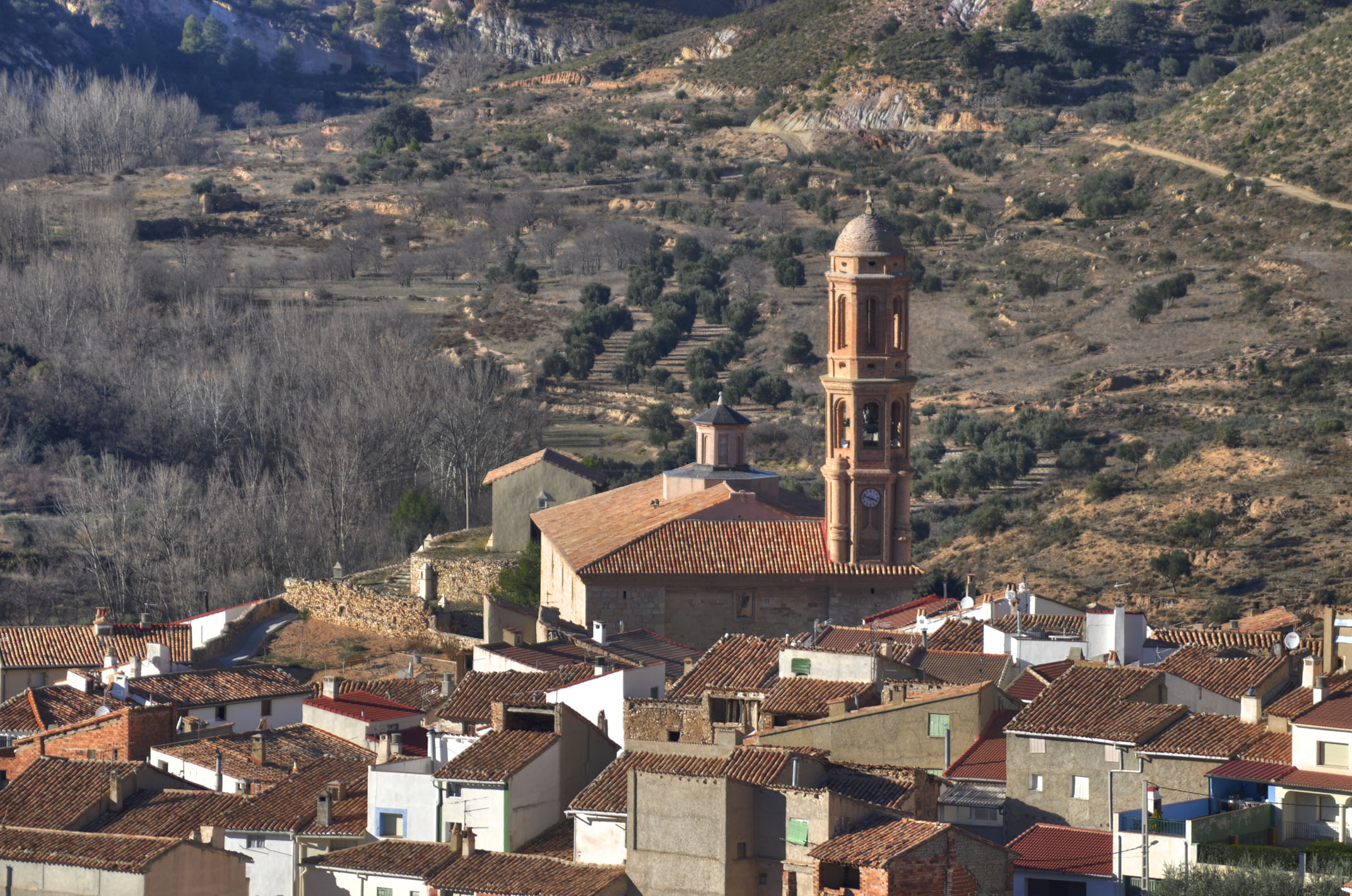
- San Martín church in Crivillén

- Coat of arms

- Location within Spain
- Coordinates: 40°53′N 0°34′W
- Country: Spain
- Autonomous community: Aragon
- Province: Teruel
- Comarca: Andorra-Sierra de Arcos

Area
  - Total: 42.04 km^{2} (16.23 sq mi)

Population (2025-01-01)
  - Total: 92
- Time zone: UTC+1 (CET)
  - Summer (DST): UTC+2 (CEST)

Crivillén is a municipality in the Andorra-Sierra de Arcos comarca, province of Teruel, part of the autonomous community of Aragon, Spain. According to the 2023 census the municipality has a population of 90 inhabitants. Its postal code is 44557.

The sculptor Pablo Serrano spent his youth in Crivillén, and there is a museum on his honor.

According to Agustín Ventura Conejero, the name Crivillén comes from the Latin Fundus Crivillanus, Fundus meaning farm or place and Crivillanus coming from Criviliano or Crivilio. It is not clear who Criviliano or Crivilio refers to, but it is speculated to refer to a Roman official. Eventually, Fundus Crivillanus was shortened to Crivillanus and then again to Crivillán or Crivillén.

== See also ==
- Andorra-Sierra de Arcos
- List of municipalities in Teruel
