= Alloza =

Alloza, Spain
- municipality
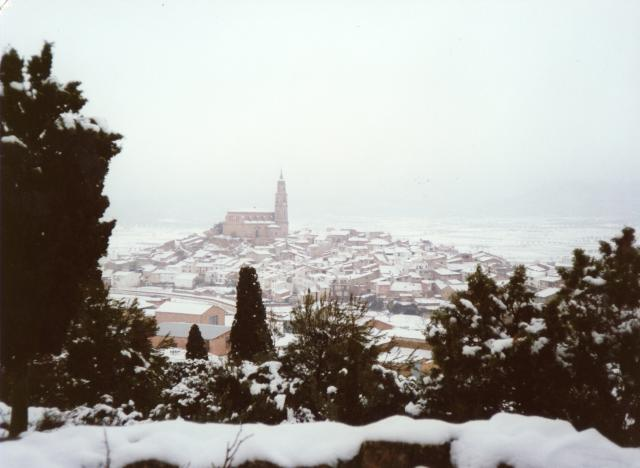

- Coat of arms

- Location within Spain
- Coordinates: 40°58′N 0°31′W
- Country: Spain
- Autonomous community: Aragon
- Province: Teruel

Area
  - Total: 81 km^{2} (31 sq mi)
- Elevation: 668 m (2,192 ft)

Population (2025-01-01)
  - Total: 556
  - Density: 6.9/km^{2} (18/sq mi)
- Time zone: UTC+1 (CET)
  - Summer (DST): UTC+2 (CEST)

Alloza is a municipality in Aragon, in the Andorra-Sierra de Arcos region of the province of Teruel. It has a population of 556 (register office, 2025) and an area of 81.6 km².

== Toponymy ==
The word Alloza comes from the Arabic اللوزة al-lawza(t), the almond, unit of lawz, almonds.

== Prehistory ==
There are important archaeological remains in the municipality, such as that of "Partida de las Naves", where a flat bronze axe and a dagger have been found, both classified as Argaric (Ancient Bronze).

The Iberian site of Castelillo stands out, 2 km northwest of the municipality, which dates from the 3rd and 2nd centuries BC. It is a village located on a very steep hill, on the slopes of which are grouped the houses, built with stone plinths and adobe walls, and whose roof would be made of branches and mud. The rich pottery found is important, especially vases with very varied pictorial decoration.

== See also ==
- List of municipalities in Teruel
