= Ejulve =

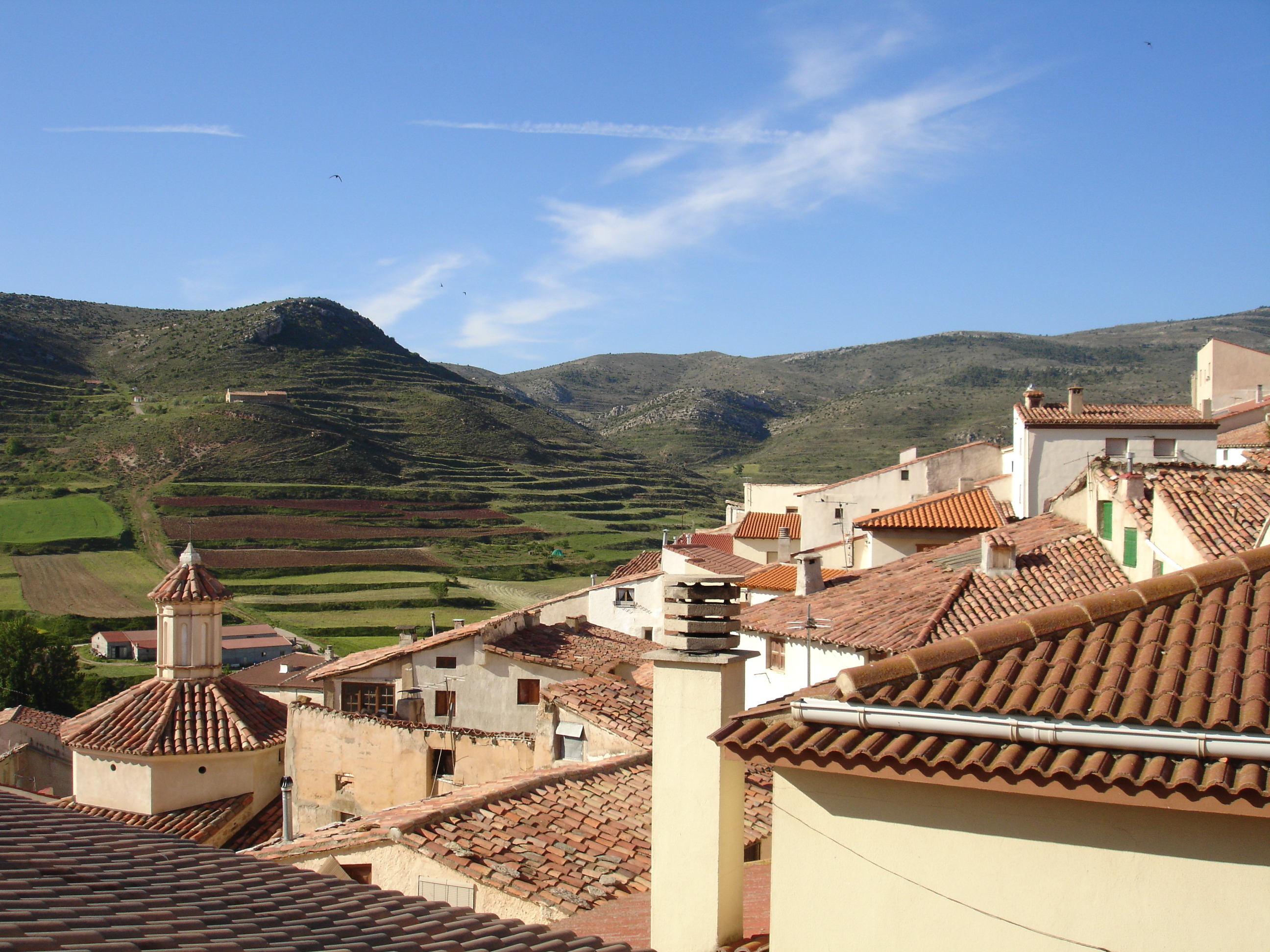

- Location within Spain
- Coordinates: 40°46′N 0°33′W
- Country: Spain
- Autonomous community: Aragon
- Province: Teruel
- Municipality: Ejulve

Area
  - Total: 109 km^{2} (42 sq mi)

Population (2025-01-01)
  - Total: 172
- Time zone: UTC+1 (CET)
  - Summer (DST): UTC+2 (CEST)

Ejulve is a municipality located in the Andorra-Sierra de Arcos comarca, province of Teruel, Aragon, Spain. According to the 2022 census (INE), the municipality has a population of 186 inhabitants.

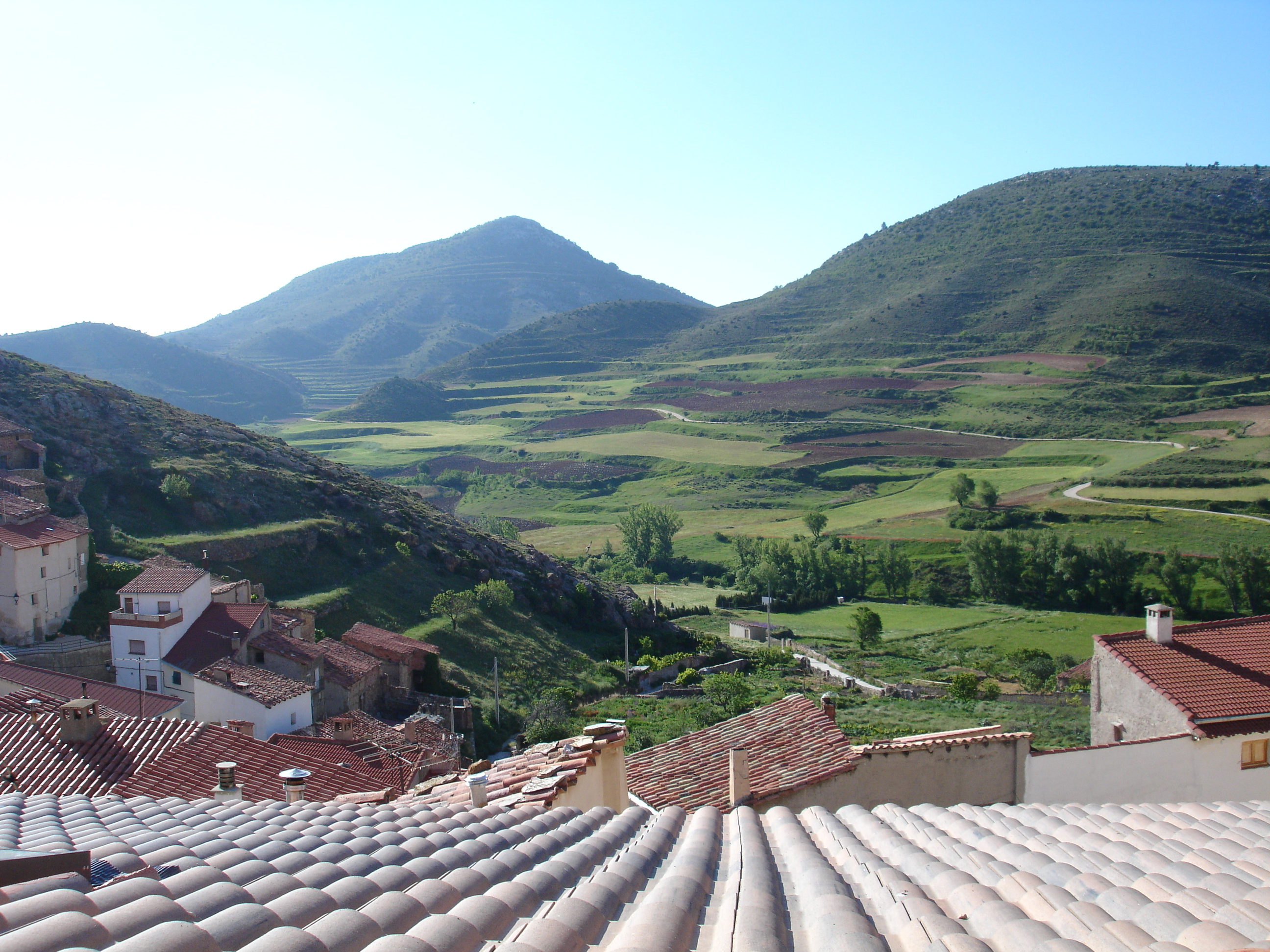
The Sierra de San Just above Ejulve

== Surrounding municipalities ==
The following diagram displays municipalities within a 26-kilometer (16 mi) radius of Ejulve.

Surrounding municipalities

== See also ==
- List of municipalities in Teruel
