= Anquela del Ducado =

Municipality in Castile-La Mancha, Spain

Anquela del Ducado, Spain
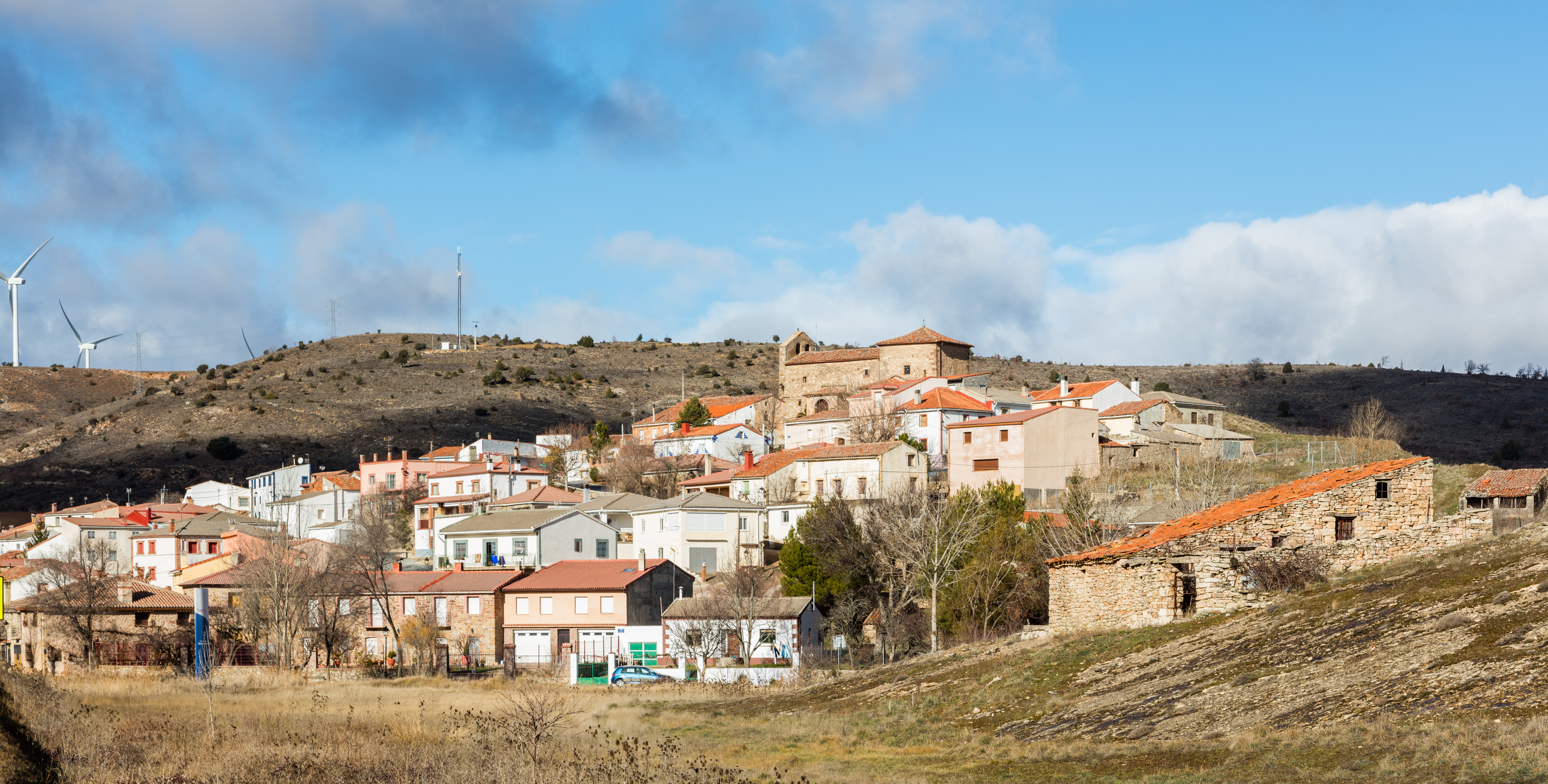

- Flag Coat of arms

- Location within Province of Guadalajara Location within Castilla-La Mancha Location within Spain
- Country: Spain
- Autonomous community: Castile-La Mancha
- Province: Guadalajara
- Municipality: Anquela del Ducado

Area
  - Total: 25.76 km^{2} (9.95 sq mi)
- Elevation: 1,128 m (3,701 ft)

Population (2025-01-01)
  - Total: 46
  - Density: 1.8/km^{2} (4.6/sq mi)
- Time zone: UTC+1 (CET)
  - Summer (DST): UTC+2 (CEST)

Anquela del Ducado is a municipality located in the province of Guadalajara, Castile-La Mancha, Spain. According to the 2004 census (INE), the municipality had a population of 88 inhabitants.
