= Nuevos Ministerios =

Government building complex in Madrid, Spain

Coordinates: 40.4440°N 3.6935°W

New Ministries
- Nuevos Ministerios
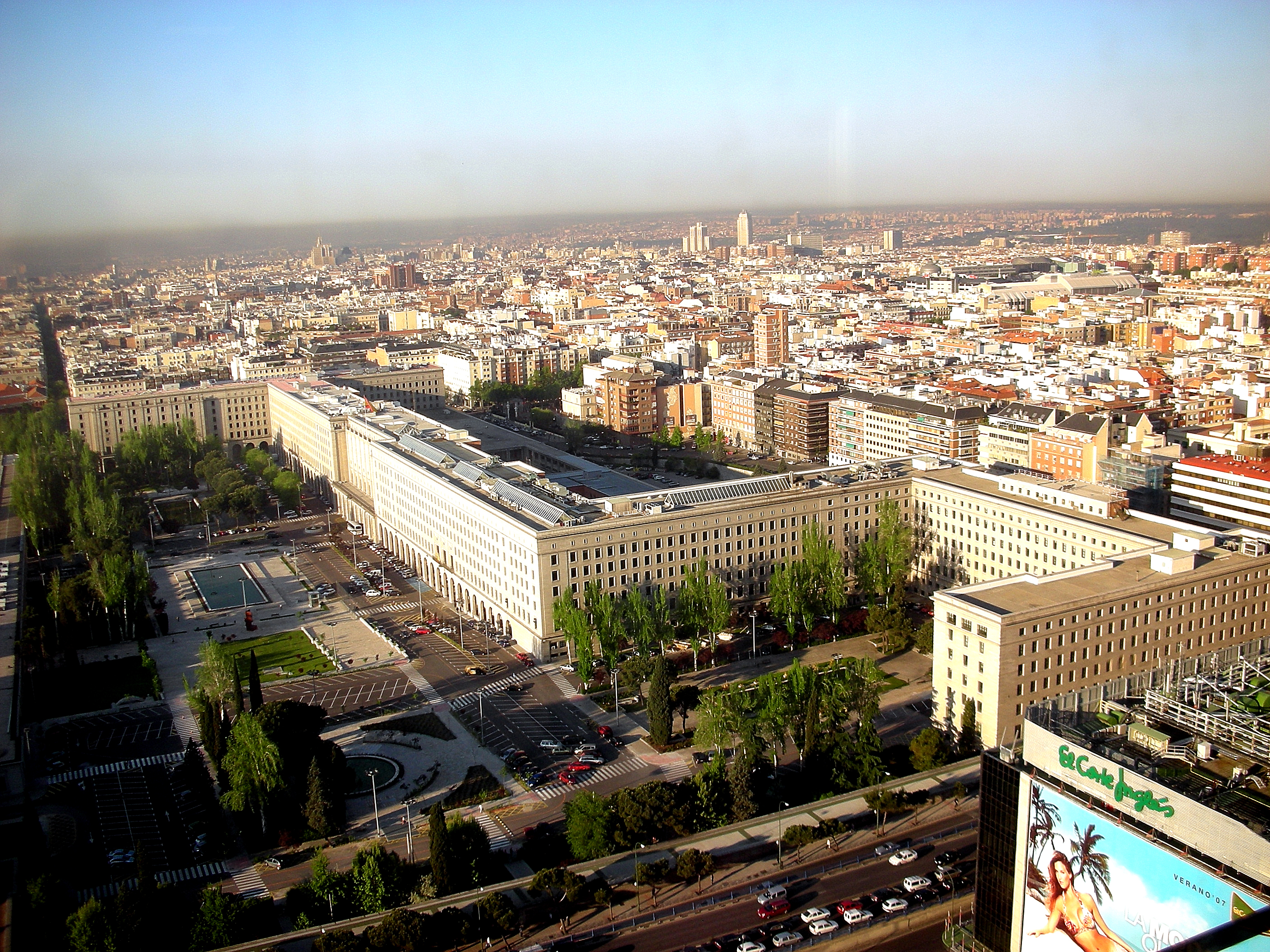
- View of the New Ministries from the BBVA Tower.
- Interactive map of the New Ministries area

General information
- Location: Madrid, Spain
- Current tenants: Ministry of Transport; Ministry of Labour; Ministry for Ecological Transition; Ministry of Social Security
- Construction started: 15 April 1933
- Completed: 1942
- Owner: Spanish government

Design and construction
- Architect: Secundino Zuazo Ugalde
- Civil engineer: Eduardo Torroja y Miret
- Known for: Be the seat of various government ministries

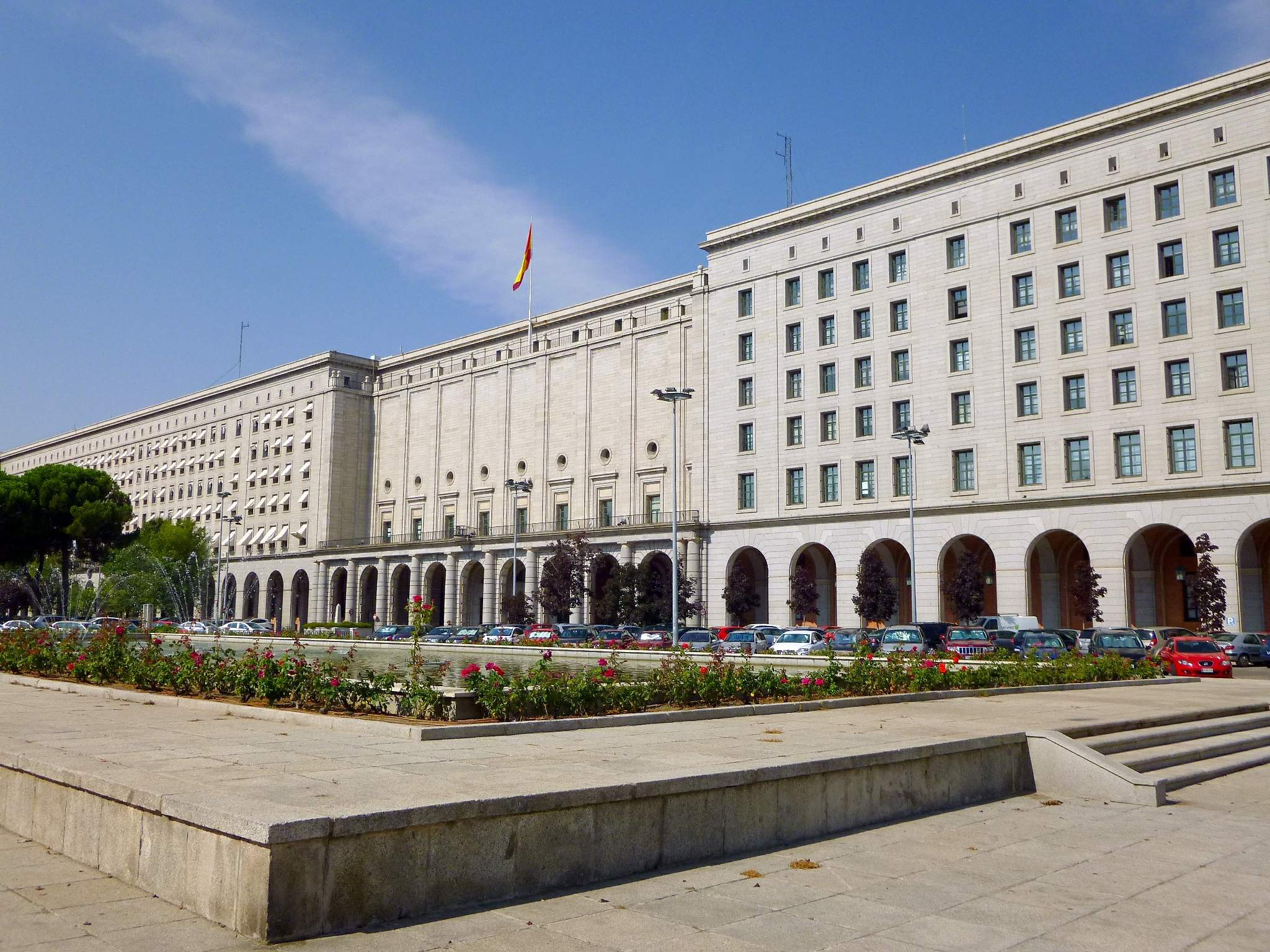
Nuevos Ministerios

Nuevos Ministerios (English: New Ministries) is a government complex in central Madrid, Spain. The complex houses several government departments: Development, Labour, Social Security, and Ecological Transition. It is located in the block delimited by the Paseo de la Castellana, the Raimundo Fernández Villaverde street, Agustín de Betancourt street and the San Juan de la Cruz square.

The original project was the work of the architect Secundino Zuazo Ugalde and was soon sponsored by the then Minister of Public Works, Indalecio Prieto. Its construction began in 1933 and, although it was paralyzed during the Civil War, the entire complex was completed in 1942. It currently houses the headquarters of the Ministry of Labour and the Ministry of Public Works, among others. The entire architectural complex is integrated into the so-called AZCA center, one of the most important business centers and offices in the capital. In the vicinity is also the Nuevos Ministerios station, a multiple exchanger with services of Bus, Metro and Cercanías.

The building is used in the third and fourth seasons of the series Money Heist (La Casa de Papel in Spanish), in which it is being used as the Bank of Spain.

== History ==
New Ministries

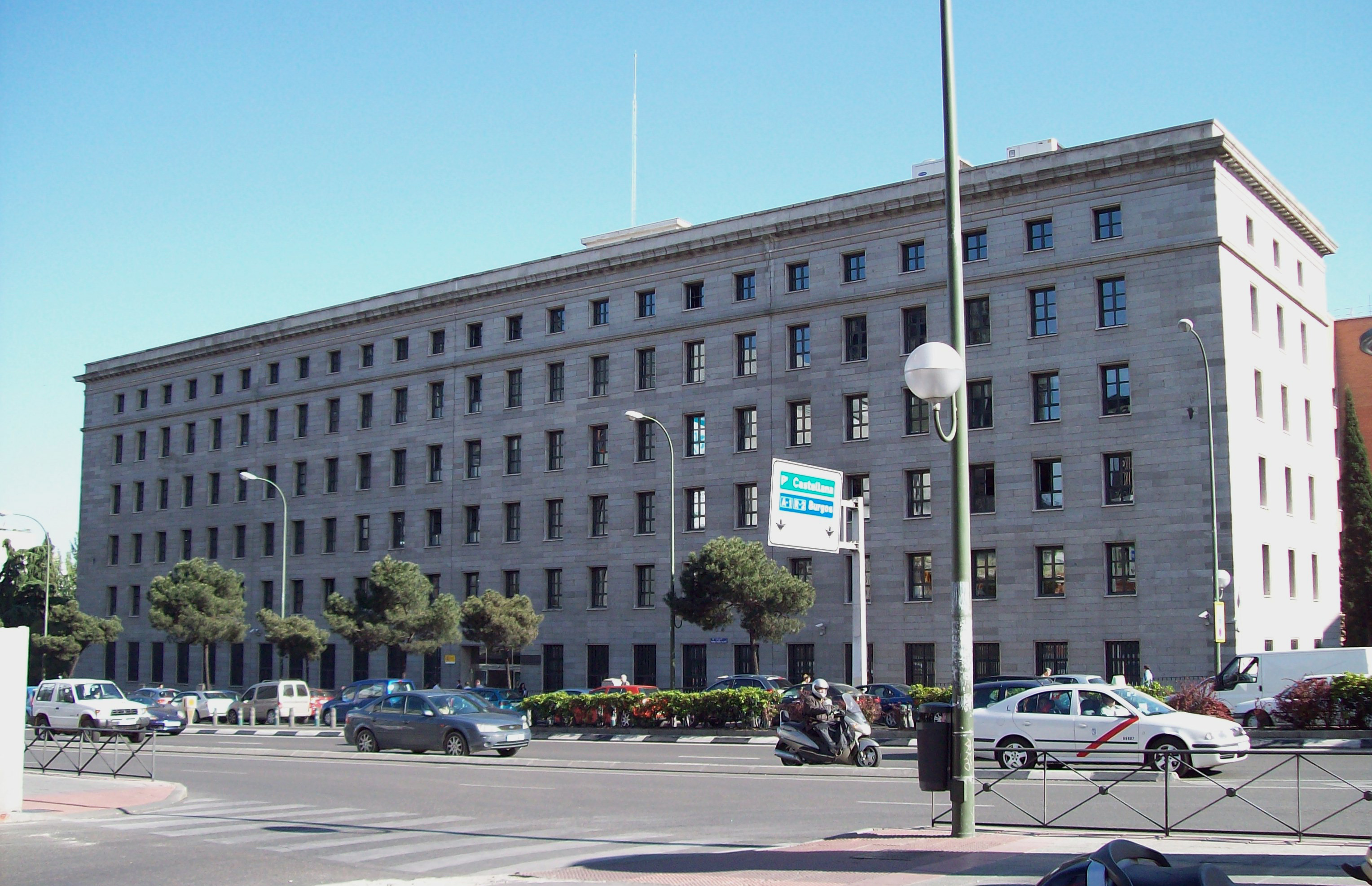
North side

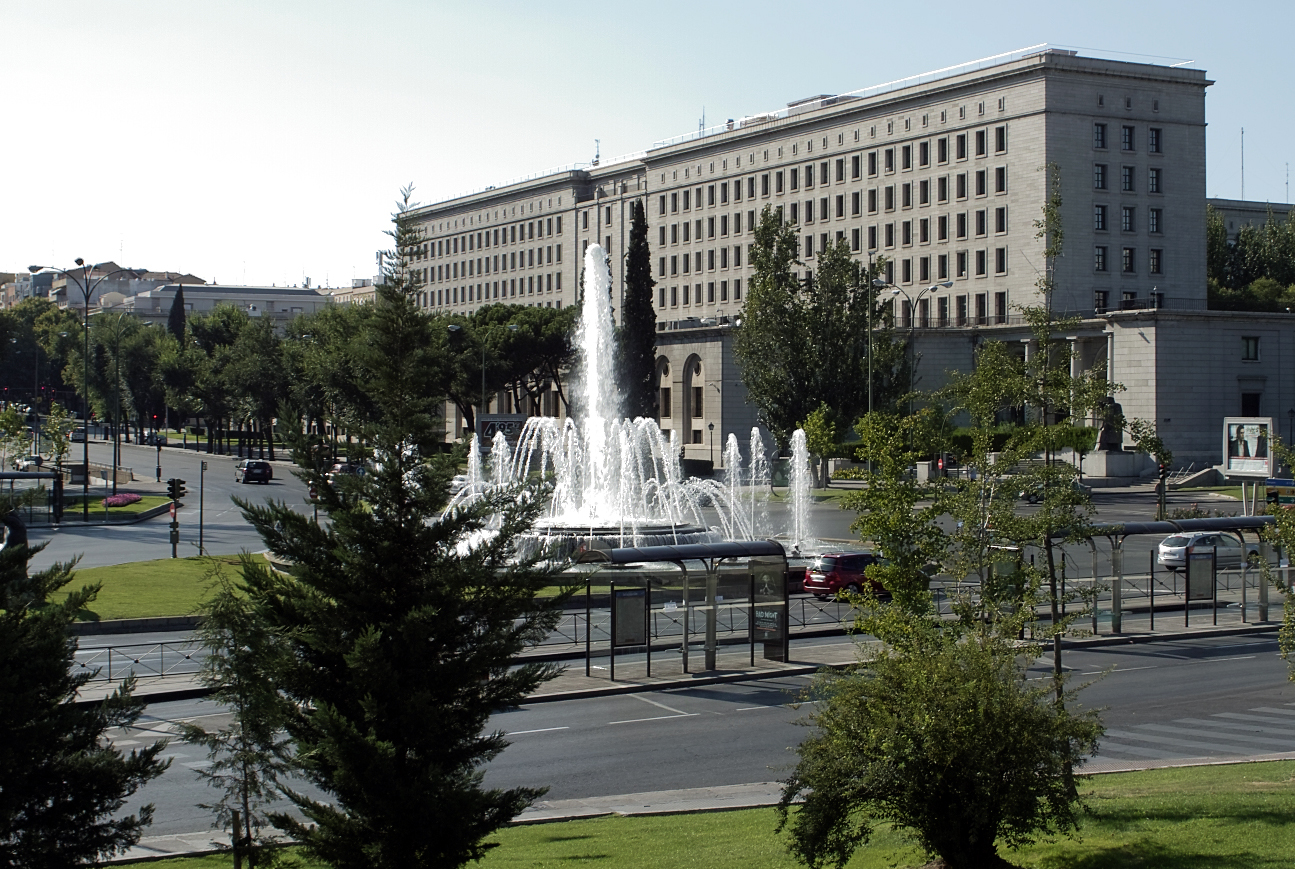
South side

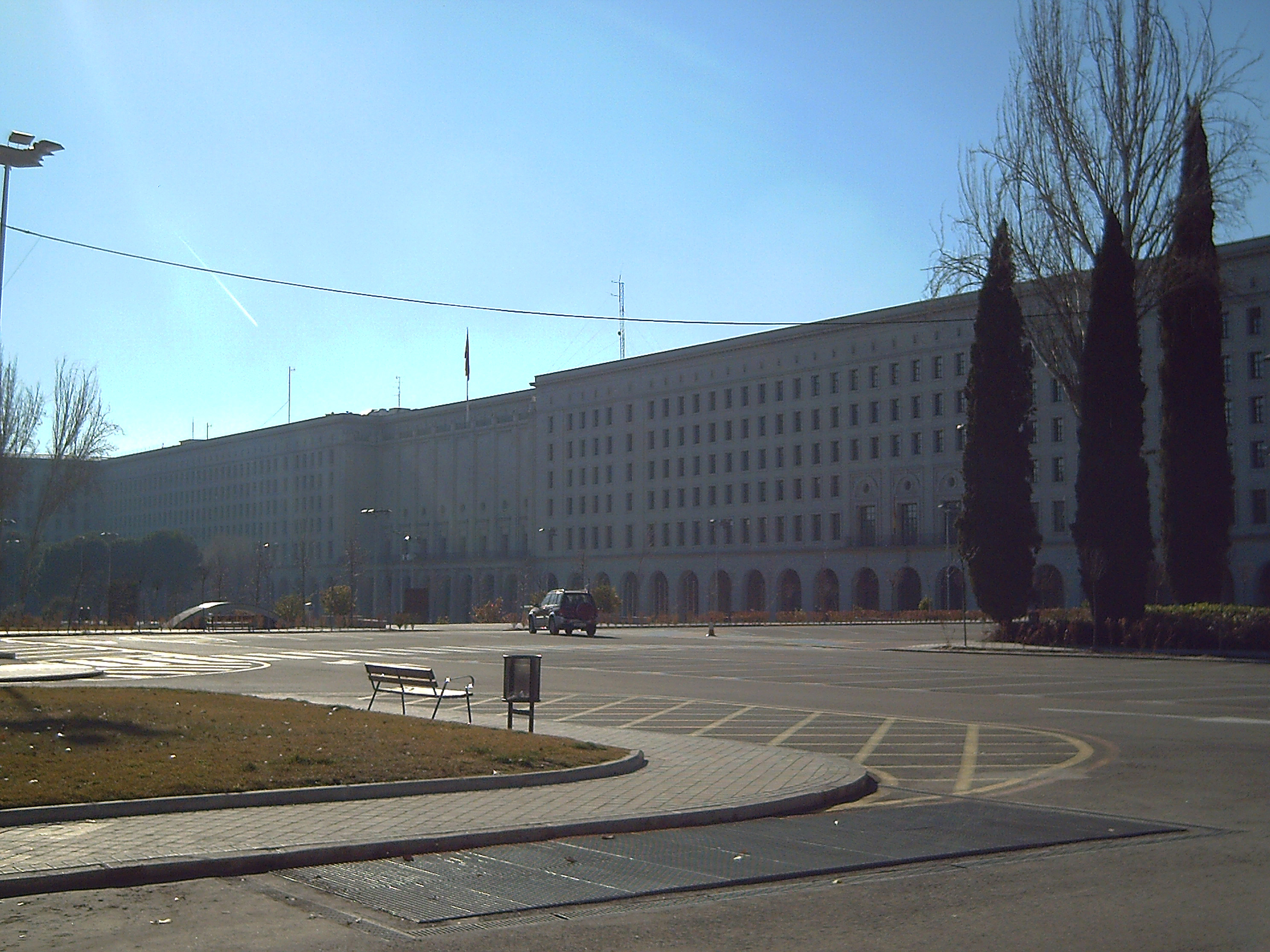
East side

=== Background ===
During the 1920s, Madrid had surpassed one million inhabitants (with about 800,000 at the beginning of the decade) and the city grew at a good pace (the expansion was almost entirely built as suburbs arose on the suburbs without order or concert). At the end of the decade, and in order to growth and solve the nascent traffic problems, the City Council convened an International Competition for the Ordination of Madrid in 1929, which did not materialize. One of the plans presented had been drawn up by the Spanish architect Secundino Zuazo and the German urbanist Hermann Jansen.

Shortly after the proclamation of the Republic, the City Council required the City Planning Office to expand the city. The office prepared it in a very short time, based on the proposals of Zuazo and Hansen. The Government of the Republic considered as a priority the modernization of Madrid and, in 1932, it approved the Capitality Act of Madrid. A year later, the Ministry of Government approved the General Expansion Project, taking almost the entire Municipal Office project.

The fundamental point of the project was to achieve the expansion of the city to the north, around the Paseo de la Castellana. As part of this purpose, the old racecourse, which was an obstacle to the planning of Paseo de la Castellana, was demolished. Another important milestone of the project was the construction of rail links between the stations in Madrid. Again Zuazo, this time as a member of the Railways Commission of the Ministry of Public Works, played a relevant role, in charge of convincing Minister Prieto of the inconvenience of placing the Ministry of the Interior in the center of Madrid (in Callao) And to build the rail link between the stations of the North and Atocha, under the Gran Vía, due to the great congestion that would occur in the center of Madrid.

Thus, on the site left empty by the demolition of the racecourse, the government of the Republic projected, as early as 1932, the construction of a complex in which to locate the ministerial departments, while building an underground rail link between Atocha-Cercanías and a new station in the north, Chamartín, which would be built by the engineer Eduardo Torroja and popularly called the "tunnel of the laughter".

=== Project and construction ===
The idea of constructing the New Ministries had been the work of Indalecio Prieto, Minister of Public Works. However, this idea had already been raised by Zuazo in his "Prolongation Project of Castellana" in 1930, so Prieto commissioned the construction of what would be the New Ministries, to house the ministries of Public Works and Government. After the demolition of the racecourse, the first stone was laid on April 15, 1933. Zuazo took the Escorial as an inspiration for the project. However, at the beginning of the Civil War, the New Ministries were unfinished, and the persecution suffered by Zuazo at the end of the war, during which he had been exiled in France, prevented him from continuing with the project. This was finalized by a team of architects related to the new regime, which eliminated or modified important parts of the project, such as the skyscraper planned for the north side. The work was finally completed in 1942, although the Ministry of Public Works and Urban Planning (MOPU) did not move there until 1958.

There are suspicions that Zuazo shaped the plant as the Communist emblem of the hammer and sickle, since he was a supporter of the Soviet Union. The reference would not be noticed by the later Francoist architects.

=== Present Day ===
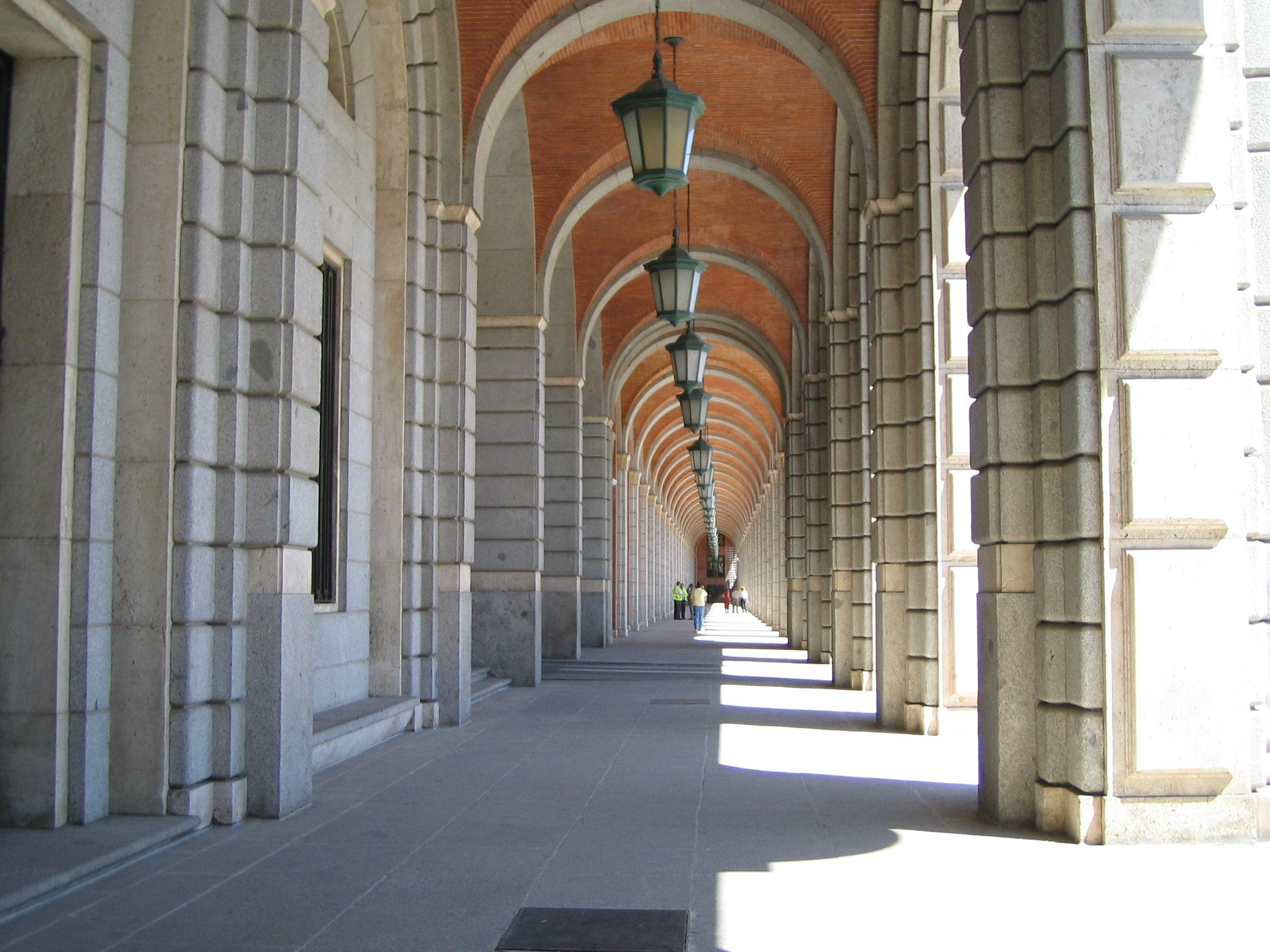
Arcade belonging to the East side of the complex.

Nuevos Ministerios currently houses the headquarters of the Ministry of Transport, Labour, Social Security, as well as the Ministry for Ecological Transition. The complex is fully integrated into the Castellana and the AZCA Complex, one of the most important business centers and offices in the Spanish capital.

From the exchanger of the Nuevos Ministerios Station you can reach the government complex, through Cercanías (Lines C-1, C-2, C-3, C-4, C-7, C- , Metro (Lines 6, 8 and 10) and Madrid Buses (Lines 7, 14, 27, 40, 126, 147, 150, C1 and C2).

== Characteristics ==
The current aspect of the whole retains much of the original form and style of the project, in which the echoes of the Monastery of El Escorial (in whose maintenance Zuazo worked) and the House of Flowers (an earlier work by Zuazo).

The complex consists of a large central space with open spaces, fountains and ponds, around which different ministries are arranged, as well as a large arcade on the side facing Paseo de la Castellana. The archery is one of the most characteristic elements of the whole. Underneath the patio was excavated the one that at the moment is the station of Nuevos Ministerios.

The open space is used as a park by locals. It is decorated with historic items related to public works, such as road construction machinery and anchors.

== Nearby buildings ==
- El Corte Inglés Castellana department store, the chain's flagship

== See also ==
- Nuevos Ministerios (Madrid Metro)
- Statue of Indalecio Prieto
