= Mazarete =

Mazarete, Spain
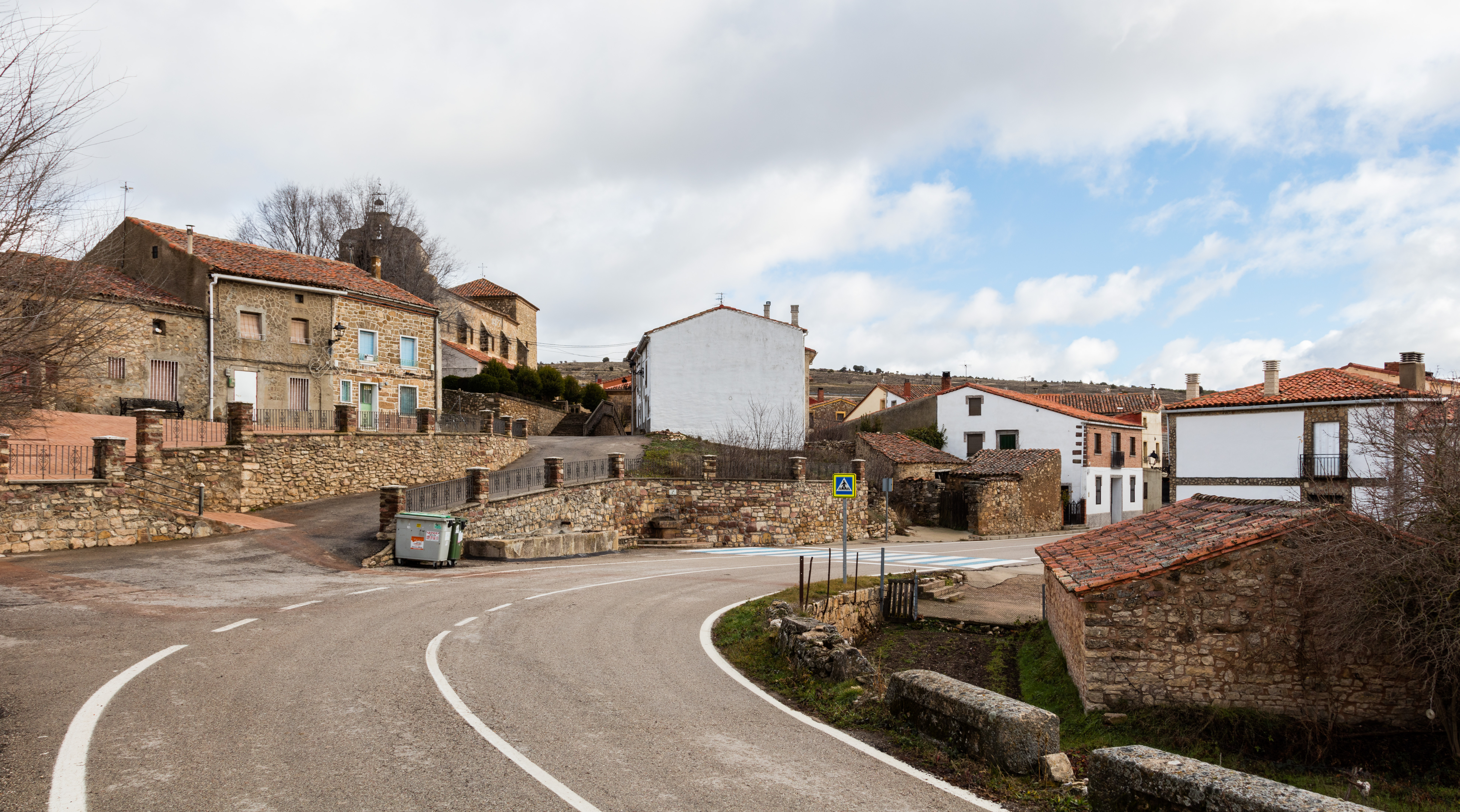

- Location within Province of Guadalajara Location within Castilla-La Mancha Location within Spain
- Coordinates: 41°00′08″N 2°09′28″W
- Country: Spain
- Autonomous community: Castile-La Mancha
- Province: Guadalajara
- Municipality: Mazarete

Area
  - Total: 55 km^{2} (21 sq mi)

Population (2025-01-01)
  - Total: 25
  - Density: 0.45/km^{2} (1.2/sq mi)
- Time zone: UTC+1 (CET)
  - Summer (DST): UTC+2 (CEST)

Mazarete is a municipality located in the province of Guadalajara, Castile-La Mancha, Spain. According to the 2004 census (INE), the municipality has a population of 66 inhabitants.
