= Sierra de San Just =

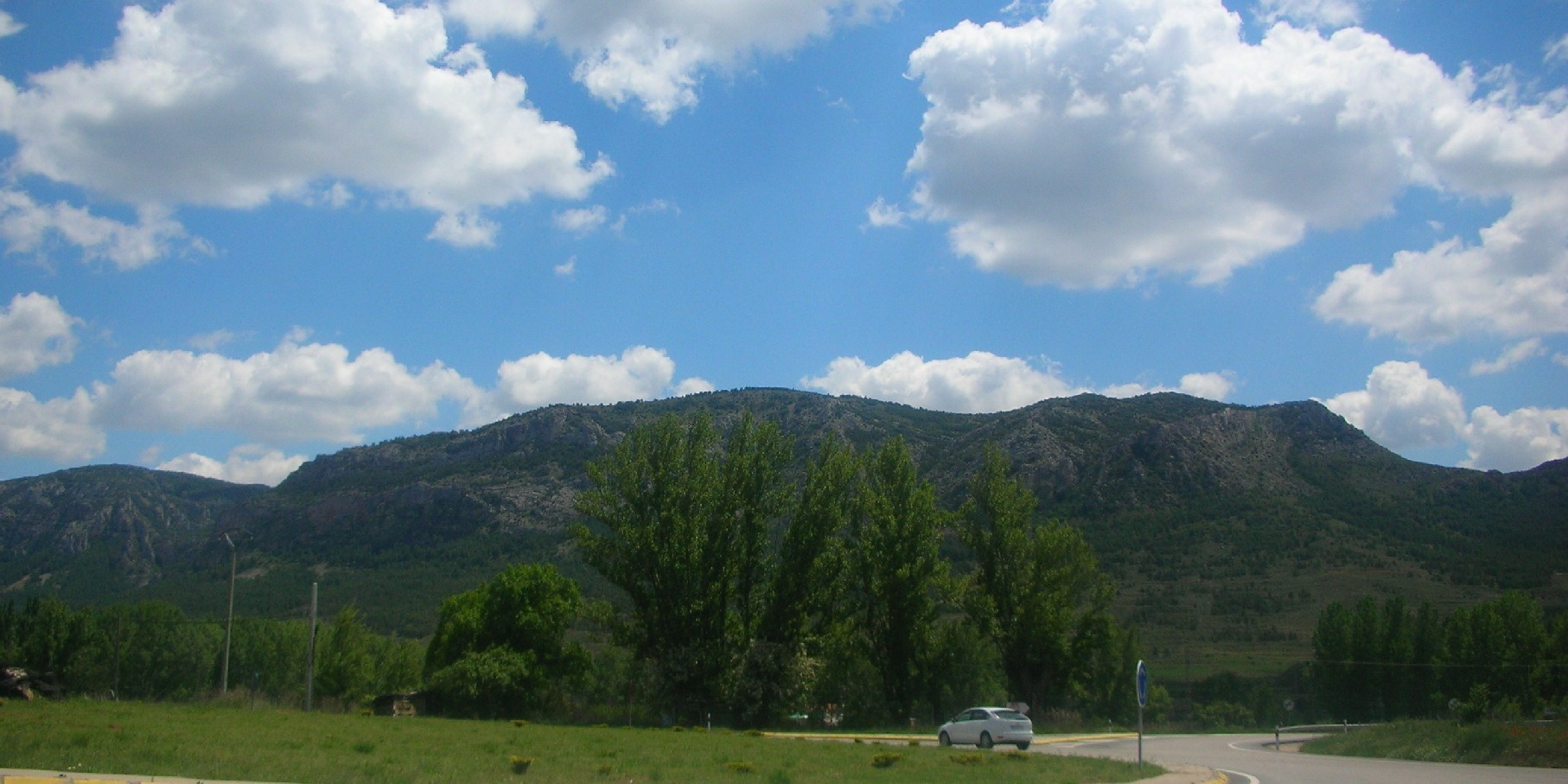
- Western end of Sierra de San Just near Montalbán

Highest point
- Peak: San Just
- Elevation: 1,522 m (4,993 ft)
- Listing: Mountains of Aragon
- Coordinates: 40°44′36″N 0°39′46″W

Geography
- Location within Spain
- Location: Cuencas Mineras, Aragon
- Parent range: Iberian System, Eastern zone

Geology
- Orogeny: Alpine orogeny
- Rock age: Cretaceous

Climbing
- Easiest route: From the towns of Ejulve, Gargallo or Montalbán

Sierra de San Just (Aragonese: Sierra de Sant Chust) is a mountain range in the Cuencas Mineras comarca of Aragon, Teruel Province, Spain. The highest point in the range is San Just (1,522 m). This range is located in one of the coldest and most rugged regions of Aragon.

== Geography ==
Landslides are relatively frequent in the San Just mountains.

Besides the mountain ranges, the Plains of Visiedo (Spanish: Llanos de Visiedo) near Visiedo, the Altos del Zancado, and the area surrounding Ejulve, are all part of the Sierra de San Just geographic zone.

Road N-211 crosses the range at Gargallo and skirts the mountainsides of the chain.

== Mining ==
There are lignite deposits in the Sierra de San Just range. The Utrillas mines were exploited since ancient Roman times.

== See also ==
- List of mountains in Aragon
- Cuencas Mineras
