= Aquilegia zapateri =

Scientific classification
- Kingdom: Plantae
- Clade: Tracheophytes
- Clade: Angiosperms
- Clade: Eudicots
- Order: Ranunculales
- Family: Ranunculaceae
- Genus: Aquilegia
- Species: A. zapateri

Binomial name
- Aquilegia zapateri Pau

Species of flowering plant

Aquilegia zapateri is a species of perennial flowering plant in the genus Aquilegia (columbines) in the family Ranunculaceae. This species is native to an extremely small range in the Sierra de Albarracín mountains in Aragon, Spain. Growing to 20 cm (7.9 in) tall, it favors rocky habitats and possesses small blue-violet flowers that bloom in June.

Very little is known about the species. It was first described by Carlos Pau y Español in 1895 and named for the Catholic priest and botanist Bernardo Zapater, who had collected the holotype. Since then, it has been repeatedly synonymized to Aquilegia hispanica. The name Aquilegia zapateri is accepted by the International Plant Names Index, Royal Botanic Gardens, Kew's Plants of the World Online, and World Flora Online.

== Description ==
Aquilegia zapateri is a perennial herbaceous flowering plant in the genus Aquilegia (columbines) in the family Ranunculaceae. The plants reach an overall height of 20 cm (7.9 in) and possess aerial stems which are slender, leafy, and glabrous (lacking in small hairlike structures) on their lower portions. The basal leaves (those emanating from the base of the plant) range between 20 cm (7.9 in) and 28 cm (11 in) long. This length includes both the relatively long stem-like petioles – which range between 16 cm (6.3 in) and 23 cm (9.1 in) long – and the leaflets. The basal leaves are biternate, with each leaf dividing into three sets of three leaflets, with pubescence (possession of hairlike structures) on both sides of the leaflets.

The blue-violet flowers on A. zapateri bloom in June. These flowers are relatively small for the genus, with diameters of about 35 mm (1.4 in). The perianth (non-reproductive portion) of Aquilegia flowers generally comprise five sepals that look like petals and five true petals. The sepals of A. zapateri are ovate-lanceolate in shape, measuring about 17 mm (0.67 in) long and 8 mm (0.31 in) wide. The petals of Aquilegia are divided in broad portions which project forward that are known as blades or limbs and conical, nectar-bearing portion projecting backwards known as nectar spurs. The petals of A. zapateri are relatively short, measuring 22 mm (0.87 in) from the end of the spur to the tip of the limb.

== Taxonomy ==
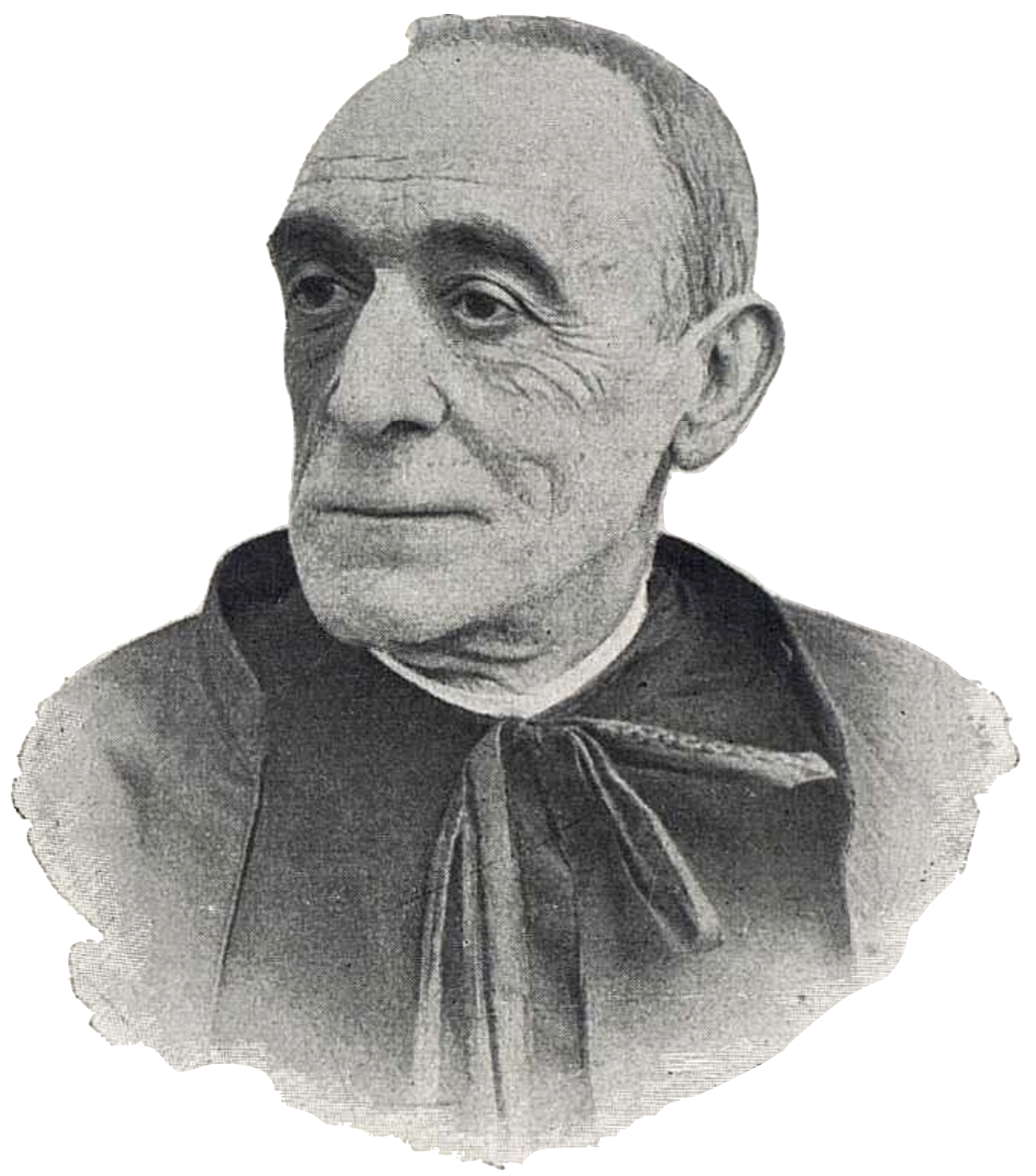
The Spanish priest and botantist Bernardo Zapater (depicted in 1903) was the namesake of Aquilegia zapateri.

The Spanish botanist Carlos Pau y Español first described Aquilegia zapater in the 1895-published sixth volume of his Notas Botánicas a la Flora Española. This description appeared in the volume's appendix, where Pau reported that he had "inadvertently omitted" it earlier in the work. Pau's description utilized a holotype collected in the Sierra de Albarracín and given to Pau by the Spanish Catholic priest and naturalist Bernardo Zapater. Pau named the species for Zapater, and Zapater would in 1904 make one of the few later mentions of the species.

In 1936, Pau reported that the holotype had been given to him by Zapater was defective and lacked complete type locality information. Pau pointed to specimens collected in Moscardón during June 1934 and June 1935 by Escriche and E. Moroder respectively as superior examples of A. zapateri. The small corollas and other peculiarities of these specimens were used by Pau to support his position that they comprised a distinct species native to the Sierra de Albarracín.

Due to an absence of substantial reference material beyond Pau's initial description, the species has remained among the least known European columbines. Besides Zapater and Pau, 20th-century references to A. zapateri repeatedly synonymized it to Aquilegia hispanica – or, in the case of Tomás Emilio Díaz for the Flora Iberica in 1986, Aquilegia vulgaris subsp. hispanica – while conclusions on the taxon's status were absent elsewhere. The Italian botanist Enio Nardi examined the holotype and, in 2015, appraised A. zapateri as "totally underrated" and described the synonymizations as "hastily" done. The name Aquilegia zapateri is accepted by the International Plant Names Index, Royal Botanic Gardens, Kew's Plants of the World Online, and World Flora Online.

Acknowledging the limited herbarium material, Nardi placed A. zapateri in a species complex of western European Aquilegia which is centered on A. viscosa and occupies rocky habitats. Within this complex that also includes A. montsicciana and A. paui, the generally blue-violet flower diameters range from small to medium-small for the genus. The glandular-pubescent stems of the complex's other three members contrast with A. zapateri stems that are glabrous on their lower halves.

== Distribution ==
Aquilegia zapateri prefer temperate climates and possess a very small native range within the Sierra de Albarracín mountain range in the Aragon region of Spain. These columbines are rupicolous (grow among rocks). While the precise site where Zapater collected the holotype was not properly recorded, collections of A. zapateri were made in the 1930s at Moscardón, part of the province of Teruel.
