= Bernardo Zapater =

Spanish priest and naturalist (1823–1907)

The Reverend Bernardo Zapater
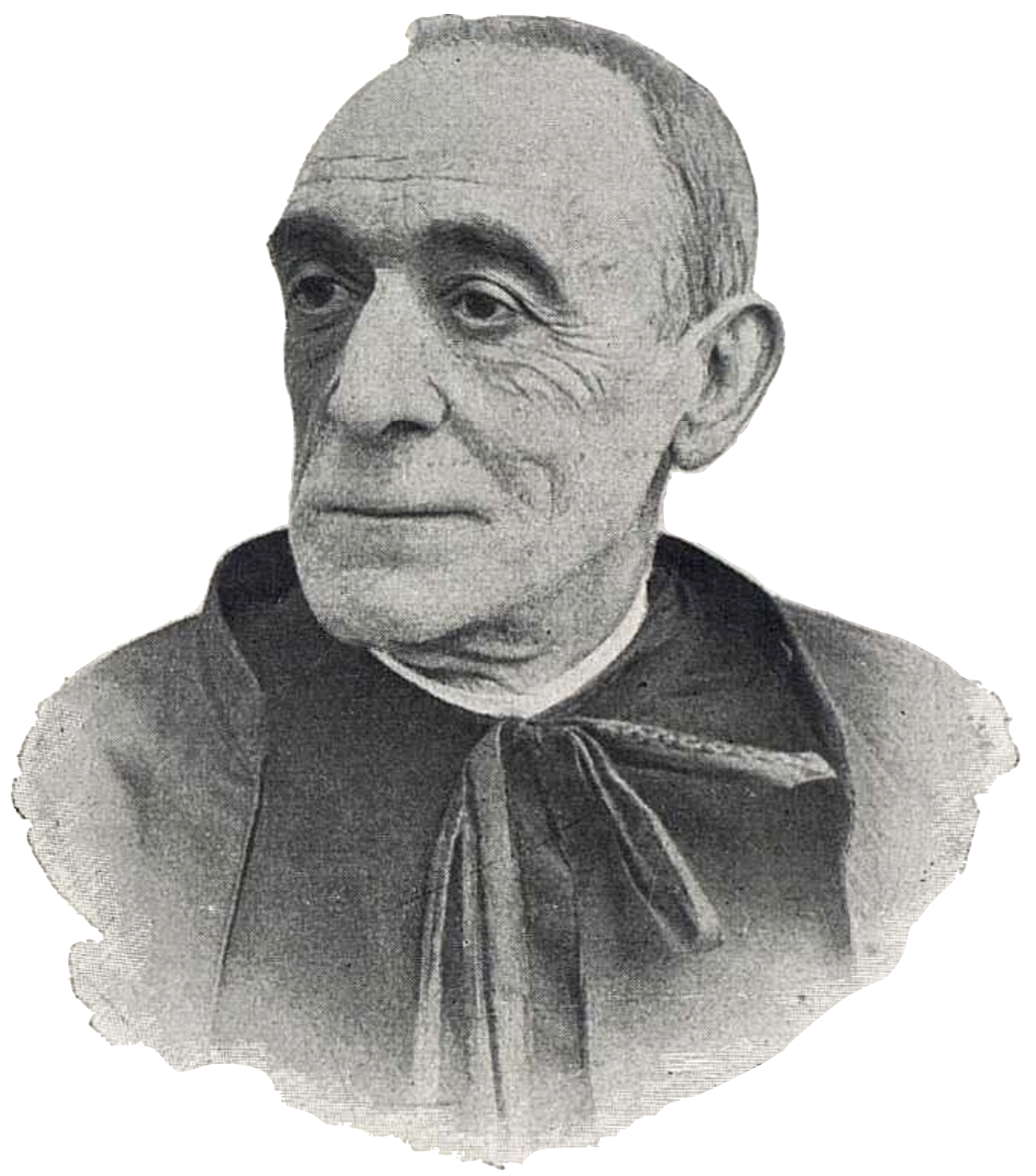
- Zapater in 1904

Personal life
- Born: Bernardo Zapater y Marconell; 19 or 20 August 1823 Albarracín, Spain
- Died: 26 December 1907 (aged 84) Albarracín, Spain
- Notable work: "Flora Albarracinense o Catálogo de las plantas de los alrededores de Albarracín y su Sierra" (1904)
- Education: Universidad Central de Madrid; Academia de San Fernando
- Known for: Studies in natural science

Religious life
- Denomination: Catholic Church
- Founder of: Colegio de San Vicente de Paúl
- Ordination: 1858

Senior posting
- Post: Convent of Las Descalzas Reales (1859); Hospital del Carmen (1860)
- Students: Blanca Catalán de Ocón Clotilde Catalán de Ocón

Bernardo Zapater y Marconell (19 August 1823 – 26 December 1907) was a Spanish Catholic priest, naturalist, and educator who was among the founder of the Sociedad Española de Historia Natural and Sociedad Aragonesa de Ciencias Naturales. Born in Albarracín in Aragón, he studied at seminaries in Teruel and Cuenca and at the Universidad Central and Academia de San Fernando in Madrid, attaining the degrees of Bachelor of Philosophy in 1852, Bachelor of Canon Law in 1853, and a Physical and Mathematical Sciences degree in 1860. He was ordained as a priest in 1858, serving as a seminary professor and as the chaplain for the Convent of Las Descalzas Reales and Hospital del Carmen in Madrid.

While in Madrid, Zapater established the Colegio de San Vicente de Paúl, now a secondary school. He grew socially connected to the city's naturalists, particularly entomologists and botanists. He became involved in both those fields of study, as well as other academic fields. In 1874, he returned to Albarracín, continuing his scientific activity. His work collecting biological specimens remains a significant influence on the studies of botany and lepidopterology in the Teruel region.

Besides publishing several works on his own, Zapater collaborated with several other scientists to publish works across multiple disciplines. His associates included the German botanist Heinrich Moritz Willkomm and the sisters Blanca and Clotilde Catalán de Ocón. Zapater assisted in founding the Sociedad Española de Historia Natural, the oldest extant private scientific body in Spain, and the Sociedad Aragonesa de Ciencias Naturales. He died in Albarracín in 1907.

== Early life and studies ==
Zapater was born on 19 or 20 August 1823 in Albarracín, a city in the Teruel region of Aragón, Spain. He started his studies at the Colegio de las Escuelas Pías de Albarracín in 1833, studying there for four years. He continued his studies at Teruel's seminary until 1843, when he moved to Madrid and began studies at the Universidad Central. There, he received a Bachelor of Arts in 1845.

He continued at the Academia de San Fernando in Madrid and finished his ecclesiastical studies at the seminary in Cuenca. From the former, he studied the physical and mathematical sciences and completed a Bachelor of Philosophy there in 1852. At the latter, he received a Bachelor of Canon Law in June 1853.

== Career ==
Zapater was ordained as a Catholic priest in 1858 and worked as a professor at Cuenca's seminary. he returned to Madrid in 1859, having been assigned as the chaplain of the Convent of Las Descalzas Reales by the Cardinal-Archbishop of Toledo, Cirilo de Alameda y Brea. Zapater resumed studies at the Universidad Central, receiving a further degree in the physical and mathematical sciences there in 1860. The same year, Zapater was assigned as the chaplain of Madrid's Hospital del Carmen by a royal order.

In 1861, he established the Colegio de San Vicente de Paul, a secondary school. As the school's director, Zapater educated Madrid's aristocracy and garnered prestige for its role in preparing students for admittance to the Escuelas Especiales. His time in Madrid also allowed Zapater to interact with the city's naturalists at social settings and during their excursions. Among those he interacted with during this time were the entomologists Laureano Pérez Arcas, Ignacio Bolívar, and Serafín Uhagon, as well as the malacologist Joaquín González-Hidalgo Rodríguez and the botanists Miguel Colmeiro Penido and Benjamín Máximo Laguna y Villanueva.

In 1871, Zapater was among the founding members of the Sociedad Española de Historia Natural (now the Real Sociedad Española de Historia Natural), the oldest private scientific society in Spain. Zapater presented the Sociedad Aragonesa de Ciencias Naturales at its first session in February 1902 and was honored by the society as a founding member. He was elected president of the society in 1903. After serving as its president, the society gave him the title of honorary member. These societies helped Zapater disseminate his work. He also engaged in regular international correspondence to share his research with other scientists.

== Legacy ==
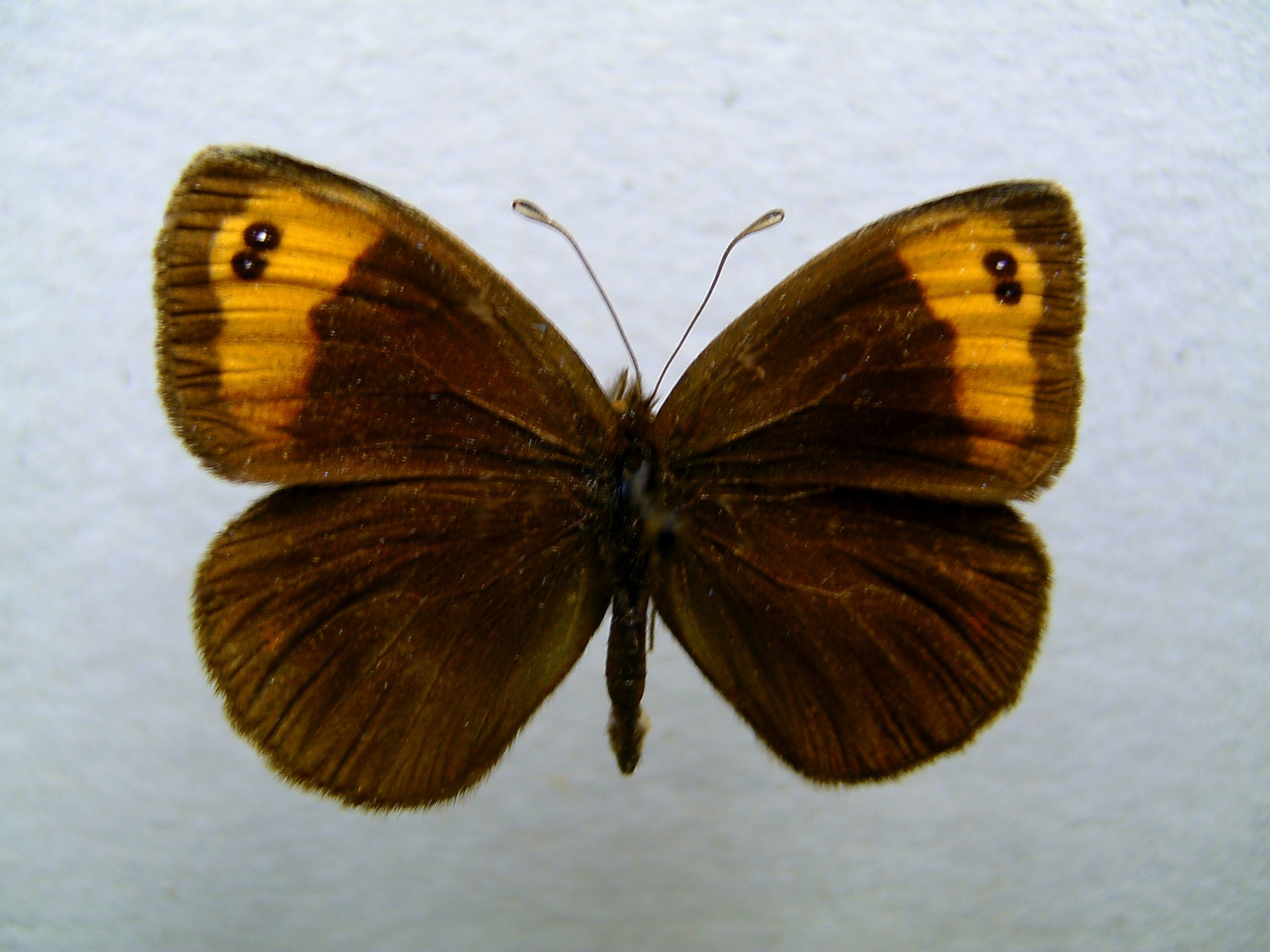
Zapater's ringlet (Erebia zapateri) is a species of butterfly named for Zapater.

In 1872, Pérez Arcas named a beetle species, Asida zapaterii, for Zapater. Pérez Arcas credited Zapater with collecting the specimen used to describe the species from Albarracin. In 1895, the Spanish botanist Carlos Pau y Español utilized a specimen collected by Zapater to describe a new species of columbine. Pau named Aquilegia zapateri for Zapater, and Zapater would make one of the few additional references to the largely obscure species. Zapater was not widely recognized during his lifetime. However, Pau considered Zapater to be among Spain's most important herbarium collectors.

Zapater is remembered as one of the leading 19th-century Turolense botanists. A hiking trail in Allepuz, Teruel, is named Ruta Etnobotánica de Allepuz "Reverendo Bernardo Zapater" in his honor. The trail opened in August 2019 and was the result of a project by Alejandro J. Pérez Cueva, a professor at the University of Valencia. It features 12 informational panels. Zapater's ringlet (Erebia zapateri), a species of butterfly also named for Zapater, can be found along the trail.
