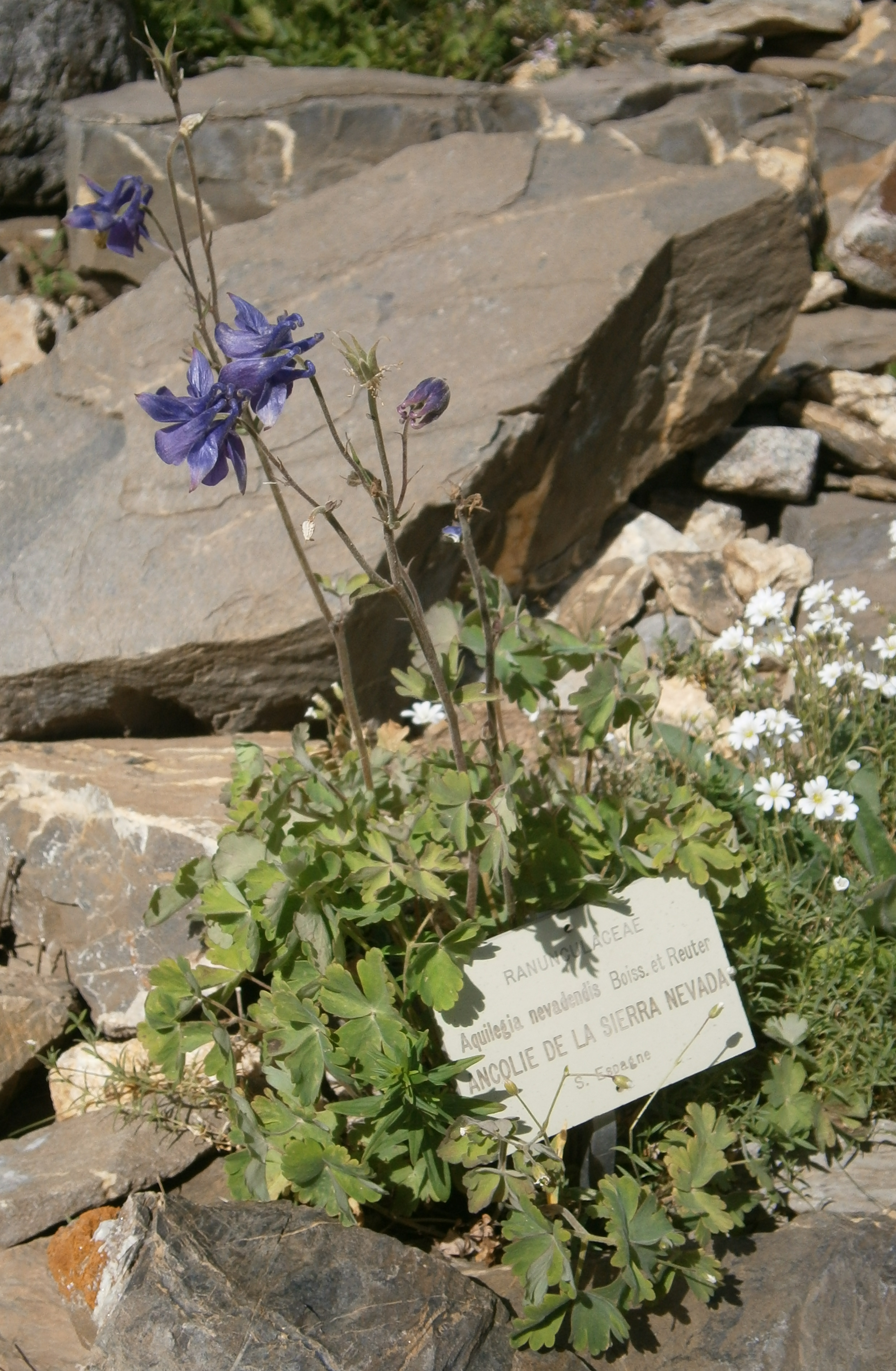
- Flowering Aquilegia vulgaris subsp. nevadensis
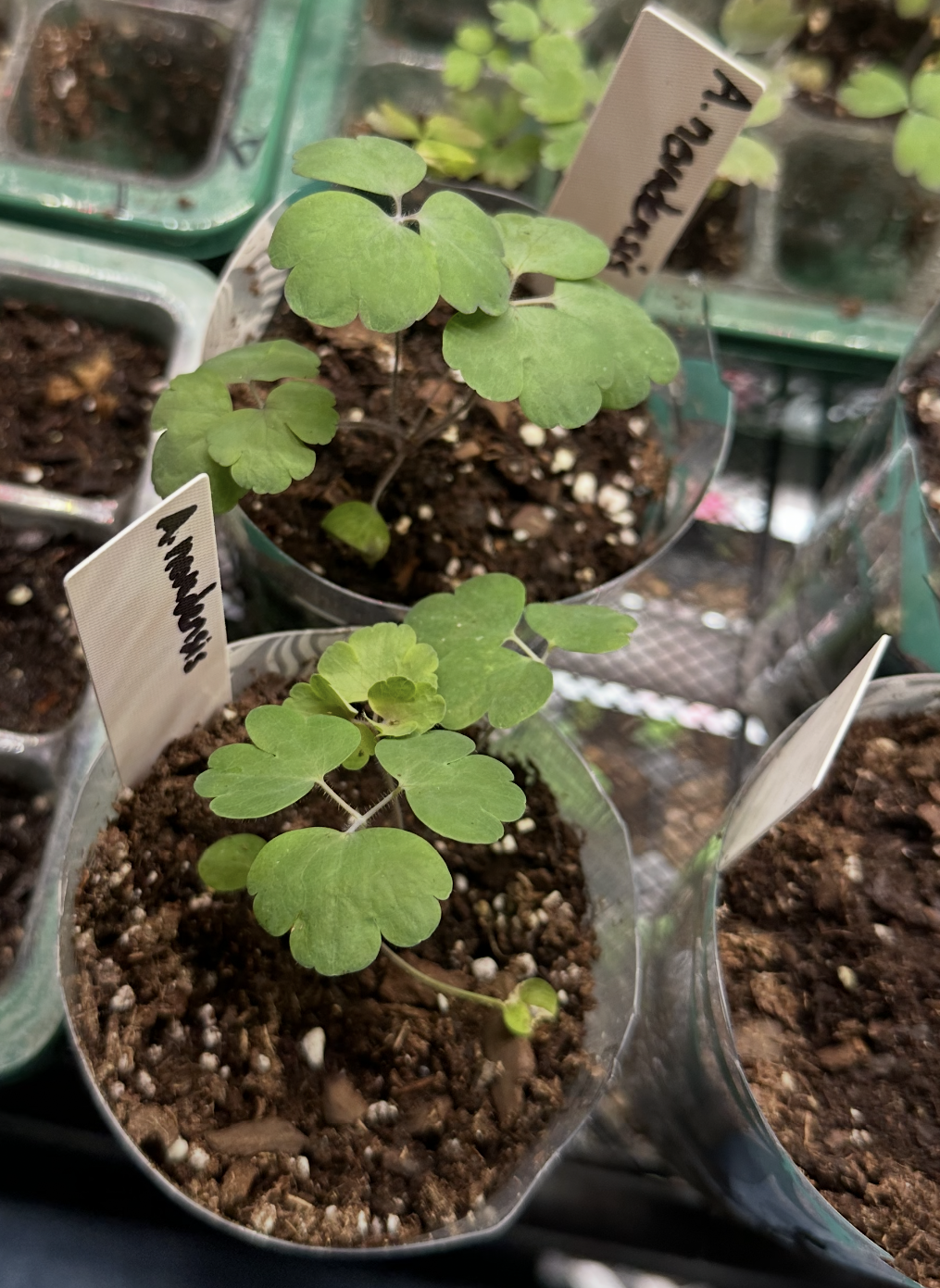
- Juvenile Aquilegia vulgaris subsp. nevadensis

Conservation status
- Near Threatened (IUCN 3.1)

Scientific classification
- Kingdom: Plantae
- Clade: Tracheophytes
- Clade: Angiosperms
- Clade: Eudicots
- Order: Ranunculales
- Family: Ranunculaceae
- Genus: Aquilegia
- Species: A. vulgaris
- Subspecies: A. v. subsp. nevadensis

Trinomial name
- Aquilegia vulgaris subsp. nevadensis (Boiss. & Reut.) T.E.Díaz

Synonyms
- Aquilegia nevadensis Boiss. & Reut. 1854; Aquilegia vulgaris var. tegedensis Pau 1916; Aquilegia vulgaris var. viscosa Boiss.

= Aquilegia vulgaris subsp. nevadensis =

Subspecies of flowering plant

Aquilegia vulgaris subsp. nevadensis is a subspecies of the perennial flowering plant Aquilegia vulgaris of the genus Aquilegia (columbines) in the family Ranunculaceae. It is endemic to the Baetic System of mountain ranges – including the Sierra de Almijara, Sierra de Baza, Sierra Nevada and Sierra de Tejeda – in the Andalusia region of southeastern Spain. It favors damp soil at elevations between 1,100 m (3,600 ft) and 2,500 m (8,200 ft). Its conservation status was evaluated as near threatened in 2014.

A. v. nevadensis plants can reach 60 cm (24 in) tall. The subspecies flowers from May to July, producing blue or violet flowers that are between 40 mm (1.6 in) and 50 mm (2.0 in) in diameter. Its nectar spurs are slightly curved and roughly the same length as the petals.

The plant was first described in 1854 by Pierre Edmond Boissier and Georges François Reuter, who considered it a new species and named it Aquilegia nevadensis. This name is still accepted by some taxonomic authorities. Since a reassessment by Tomás Emilio Díaz in 1984, the whole population has often been accepted as a subspecies of A. vulgaris. The physically distinct populations in the Sierra de Tejeda are sometimes treated as a distinct variety named Aquilegia vulgaris var. tegedensis.

== Description ==
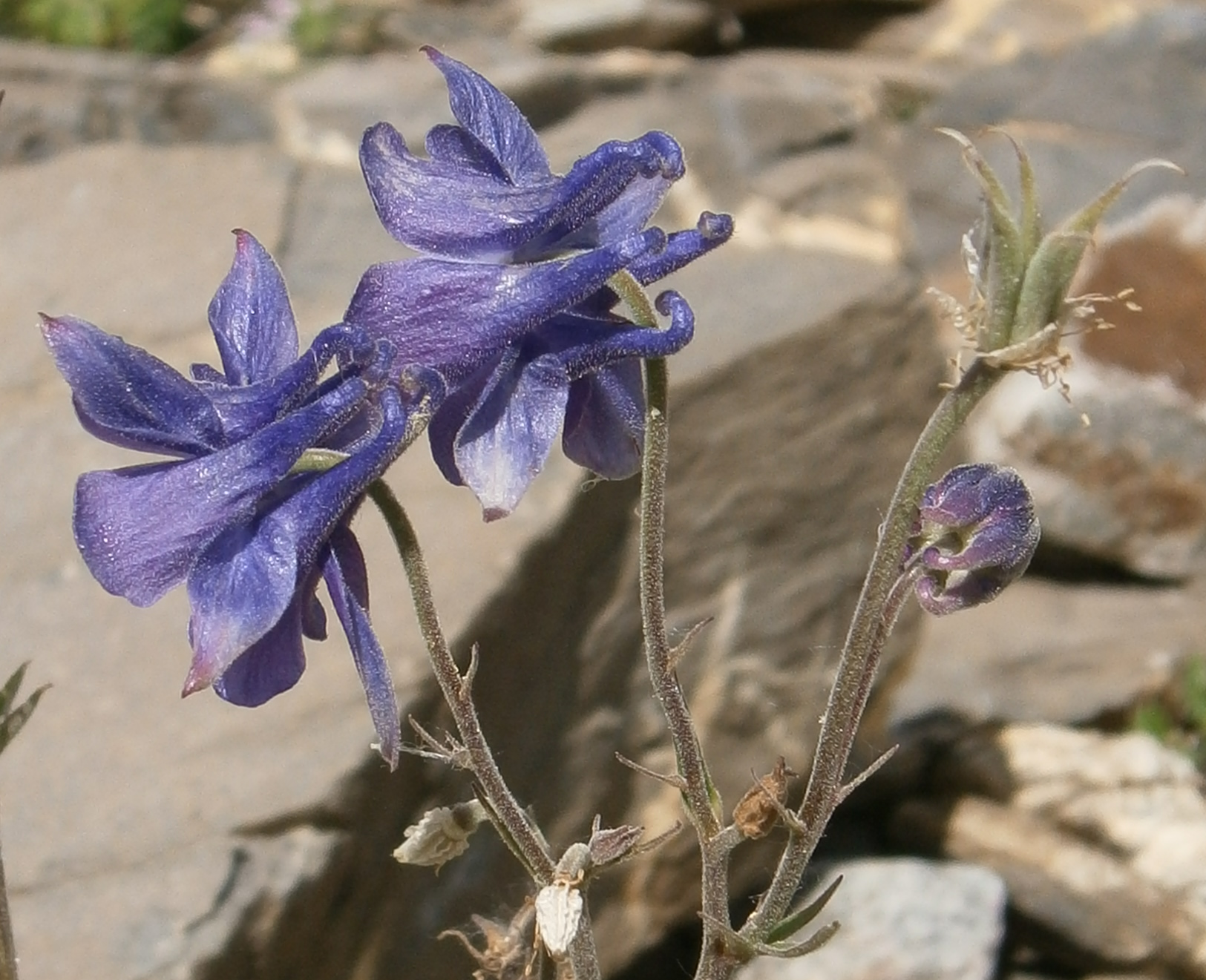
A. v. nevadensis flowers are blue or violet and feature curving nectar spurs.

Aquilegia vulgaris subsp. nevadensis is a subspecies of the perennial herbaceous plant Aquilegia vulgaris of the genus Aquilegia (columbines) in the family Ranunculaceae. The subspecies have particularly glandular-pubescent (possessing both glands and hair-like structures called trichomes) herbage and are distinguishable by the presence of curved – rather than hooked – nectar spurs. The glandular trichomes contribute to the subspecies's ability to defend against damage from insects.

Plants of this subspecies have rootstocks that are either simple or branched. From this, stems extend between 15 cm (5.9 in) and 60 cm (24 in) upwards, branching towards their ends. These stems are increasingly glandular-pubescent moving up the stem and are covered in leaves. Leaves at the base of the plant (basal) and along the stem (cauline) are pubescent. The basal leaves are biternate (three leaflets further divided into three sections), while the cauline leaves are ternate (a leaf in three leaflets).

The inflorescences are bracteate, with these bracts also glandular-pubescent. Each inflorescence bears multiple nodding flowers that are between 40 mm (1.6 in) and 50 mm (2.0 in) in diameter. Flowering occurs between May and July. Iberian columbines all possess five sepals and five petals. The flowers have been described as blue or violet On A. v. nevadensis, the ovate-lanceolate sepals typically range between 14 mm (0.55 in) and 25 mm (0.98 in) long and between 5 mm (0.20 in) and 9 mm (0.35 in) wide. The sepals are glandular-pubescent on their outside face.

The arrangement made by the petals on a flower, known as a corolla, is funnel-shaped on this subspecies. A. v. nevadensis petals are considered medium-short compared to other Aquilegia, ranging between 22 mm (0.87 in) and 33 mm (1.3 in) long including the nectar spurs. The petals' limbs (the broader portion) measure 8 mm (0.31 in) to 12 mm (0.47 in) long and 5 mm (0.20 in) and 10 mm (0.39 in) wide. The spurs can feature multiple shapes on the same flower, with specimens that possess outer spurs which are straight or curved, middle spurs of variable form, and inner spurs which are more hooked. The staminal columns are between 10 mm (0.39 in) and 13 mm (0.51 in) long, with the length of the columns of a given flower longer than its petal limbs. The staminal columns produce anthers that are colored yellow to brownish yellow. The lanceolate staminodes are 6 mm (0.24 in) long and 1.5 mm (0.059 in) to 2 mm (0.079 in) wide, sometimes also bearing anthers.

The plant's chromosome number is 2n=14. Aquilegia are prone to hybridization, though A. v. nevadensis remains genetically distinct. A. v. nevadensis shares its natural range with relatively few other taxa in the genus, which may contribute to its genetic distinctiveness. Among the hypothesized pressures driving speciation among Iberian columbines is their morphological attributes meaning that shared climatic events might have varied impacts across different taxa.

== Taxonomy ==
The taxa was first described as a new species with the name Aquilegia nevadensis by the Swiss botanist Pierre Edmond Boissier and the French botanist Georges François Reuter in 1854 within an list of seeds received by the Genevan botanical garden. The type specimen – from which the initial description was made – was collected in 1849 and a syntype was collected in 1853, both by Reuter from the Sierra Nevada mountains.

Together with Aquilegia hispanica, A. v. nevadensis heads a complex of Iberian A. vulgaris-derived taxa that share morphological similarities to Italian Aquilegia also descended from A. vulgaris. A. hispanica may represent an intermediary step as A. vulgaris moved southwards into the Iberian–African nemoral environment and developed into A. v. nevadensis and other taxa. Other members of the complex include Aquilegia cazorlensis and Aquilegia ballii. Studies published in 2006 and 2010 suggested that A. cazorlensis was most closely related to A. v. nevadensis.

In 1984, the Spanish botanist Tomás Emilio Díaz reassigned the plant as a subspecies of A. vulgaris, naming it Aquilegia vulgaris subsp. nevadensis. In the same paper, Díaz also reassessed Aquilegia dichroa as a subspecies of A. vulgaris. Among Aquilegia, A. vulgaris is the most widely distributed and most variable species. The Flora Europaea accepted the name A. v. nevadensis, which the American botanist Robert Nold followed in his 2003 description of the plant. The Flora Iberica also accepts Díaz's reassignment. A. v. nevadensis is the name preferred by the United States Department of Agriculture's National Agricultural Library Thesaurus and Glossary and the European Environment Agency's European Nature Information System.

In 1916, the Spanish botanist Carlos Pau y Español described an A. vulgaris variety native to the Sierra de Tejeda mountains, naming it Aquilegia vulgaris var. tegedensis. A specimen collected from those mountains in 1915 was identified as the type specimen for A. v. var. tegedensis. Despite a possessing a discrete phenotype, most floras of Spanish plants consider A. v. var. tegedensis synonymous with A. v. nevadensis. The Italian botanist Enio Nardi followed these floras in considering A. v. var. tegedensis a synonym within his 2015 treatment of Aquilegia in Europe. However, he accepted the taxa as a distinct species under the basionym A. nevadensis, a name also accepted by the Royal Botanic Gardens, Kew's Plants of the World Online.

== Distribution ==
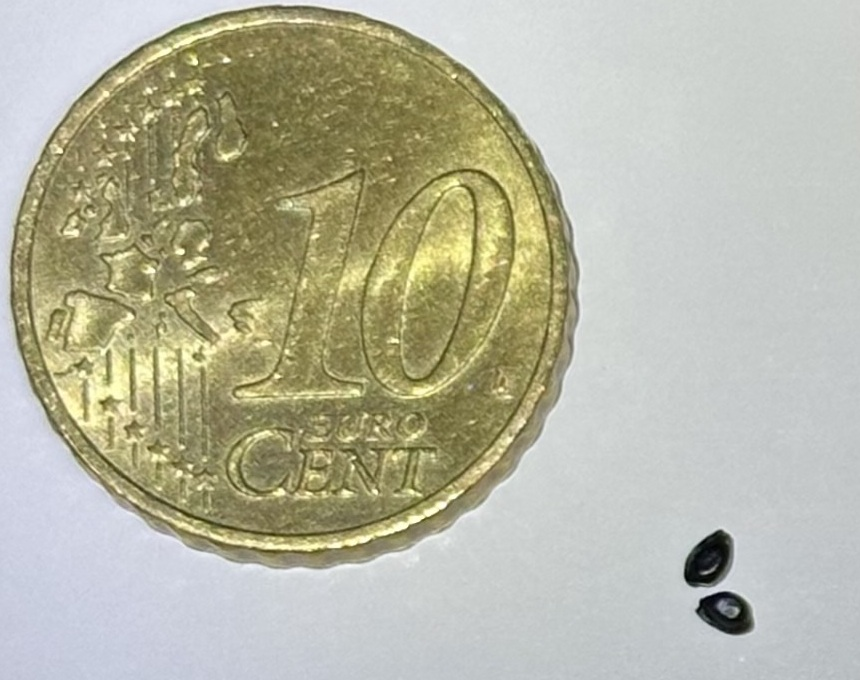
Commercially acquired A. v. nevadensis seeds

Aquilegia vulgaris subsp. nevadensis is endemic to the Andalusia region of southern Spain. Its range falls within the Baetic System of mountain ranges, including the Sierra de Almijara, Sierra de Baza, Sierra Nevada and Sierra de Tejeda ranges. The natural range of A. v. nevadensis is shared by relatively few members of its genus, potentially contributing to its genetic distinctiveness. A 2014-published paper evaluating the conservation status of Spanish herbs identified A. v. nevadensis as near threatened. The IUCN Red List has not assessed the subspecies's conservation status.

The habitat of A. v. nevadensis is found between 1,100 m (3,600 ft) and 2,500 m (8,200 ft) above sea level. It can be found in alpine meadows, spaces between forests, and along streams where the soil is always moist. Favored habitats also include high alpine springs (a characteristic it shares with the Iberian A. cazorlensis); this preferred habitat may also contribute towards restricting the expansion of A. v. nevadensis's range.

Many Aquilegia species and cultivars, primarily originating from North America and East Asia, are cultivated as ornamental plants. In 1946, American botanist Philip A. Munz reported that, while he had not observed any specimens matching the plant's description, he was aware of nurserymen advertising cultivated plants as Aquilegia nevadensis.
