= Ocon =

Ocon or OCON may refer to:

- Ocón, La Rioja, Spain
- Blanca Catalán de Ocón, (1860-1904) Spanish botanist, the first woman specialist in the field in Spain sister of Clotilde, below
- Clotilde Catalán de Ocón y Gayolá, (1863–1946) Spanish entomologist and poet, noted for her study of lepidoptera in the Sierra de Albarracín. Sister of Blanca above.
- Esteban Ocon (born 1996), French racing driver
- Francesc Josep Catalán de Ocón, 18th-c. Bishop of Urgel
- Juan Alonso y Ocón (1597–1656), Catholic prelate
- OCON, the annual Objectivist conference organized by the Ayn Rand Institute
