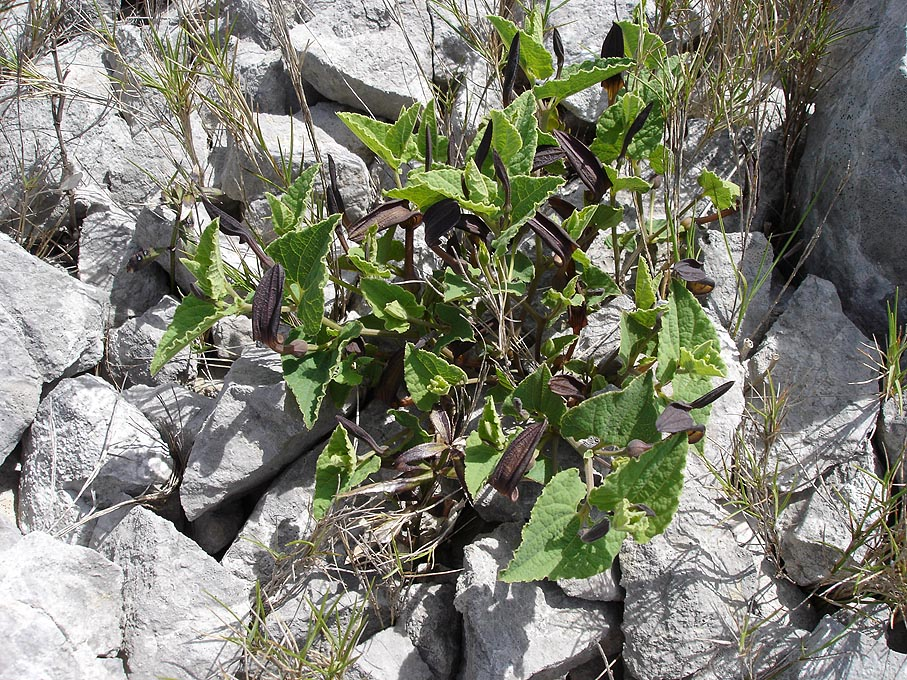

Scientific classification
- Kingdom: Plantae
- Clade: Tracheophytes
- Clade: Angiosperms
- Clade: Magnoliids
- Order: Piperales
- Family: Aristolochiaceae
- Genus: Aristolochia
- Species: A. pistolochia

Binomial name
- Aristolochia pistolochia L.

Synonyms
- Pistolochia latifolia Raf.; Aristolochia fasciculata Lam.; Aristolochia polyrrhiza Bubani

= Aristolochia pistolochia =

Species of plant

Aristolochia pistolochia is a herbaceous plant in the family Aristolochiaceae endemic to Mediterranean areas across southwest Europe.

== Description ==
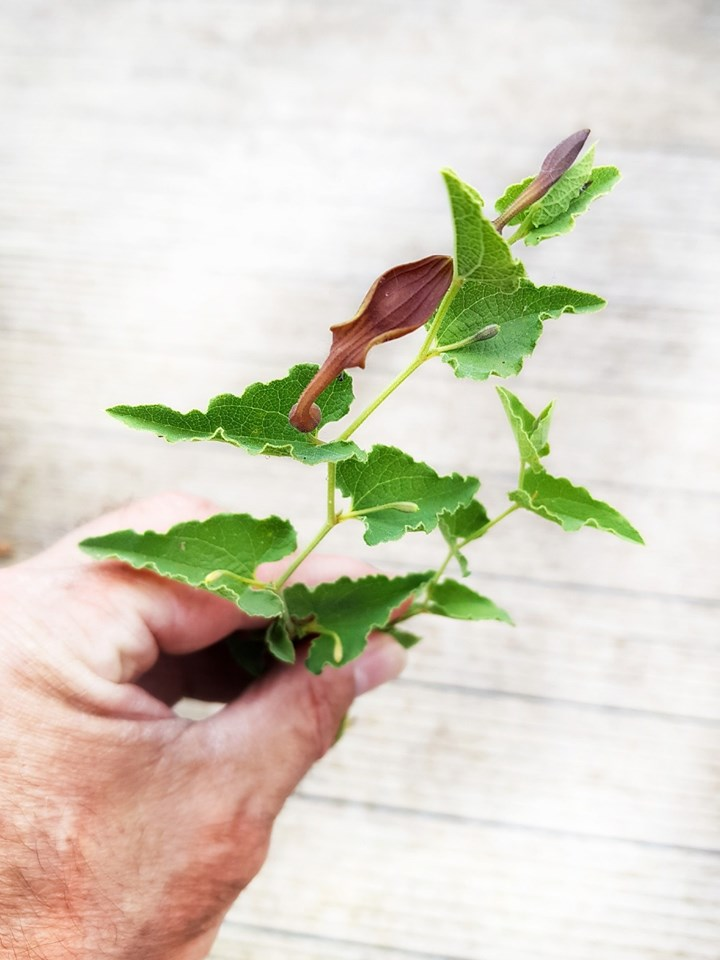

Aristolochia paucinervis is a perennial geophyte plant. Its rhizome is formed by numerous cylindrical tubers. Leaves are ovate-triangular, sharp to marginalized with cartilaginous margins, with a glaucous underside and very marked nerves. Flowers are yellow on the outside and dark reddish or green on the inside. It is similar to Aristolochia paucinervis, but can be easily distinguished by its thick, jagged leaf border.

== Distribution and habitat ==
Aristolochia pistolochia is distributed throughout southwestern Europe, including the Iberian Peninsula (in Portugal and Spain), southern France, Corsica and Sardinia. It inhabits clearings of bushes, heaths or holm oaks groves, fallows and rocky areas in basal and montane floors.

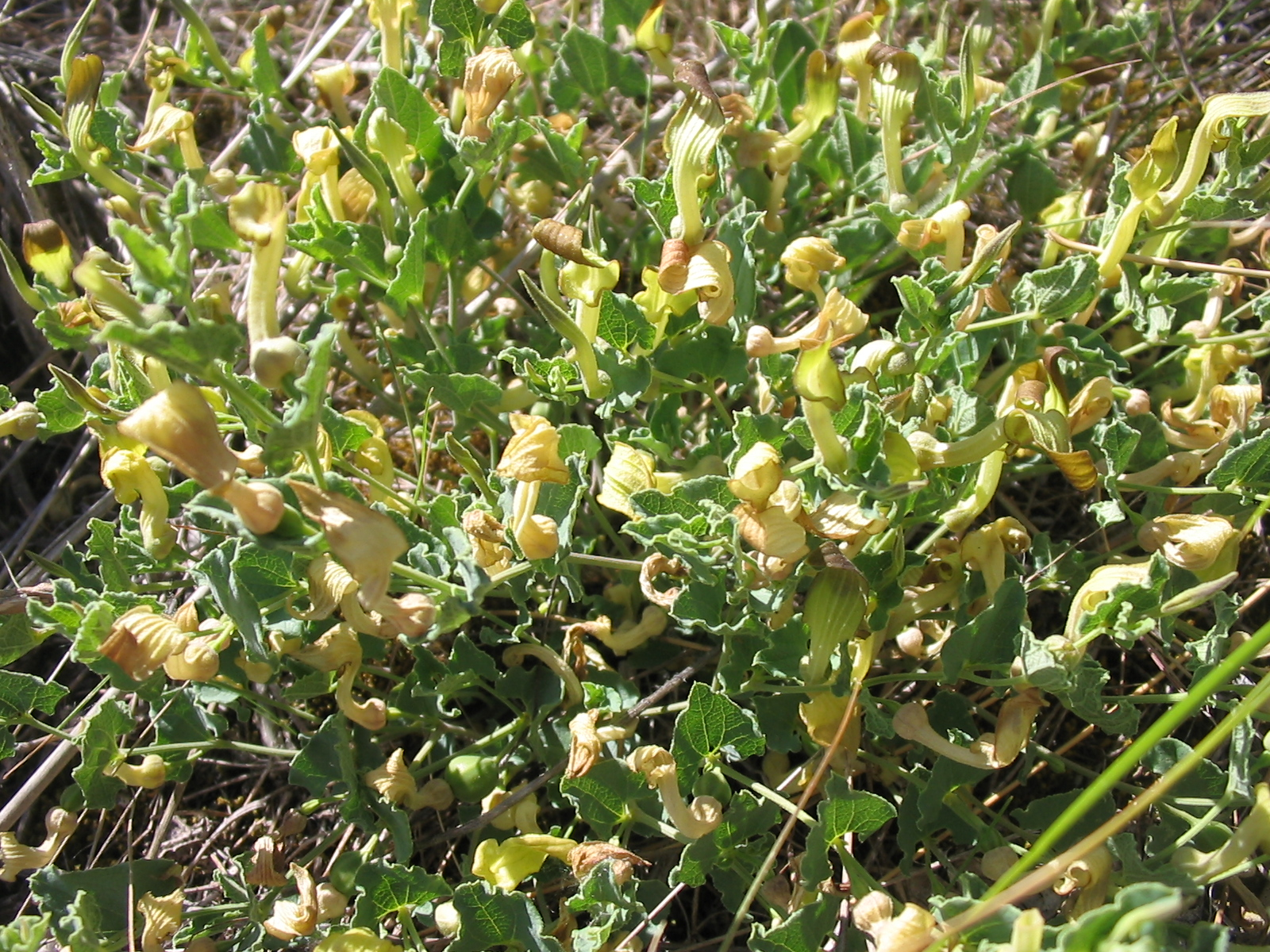

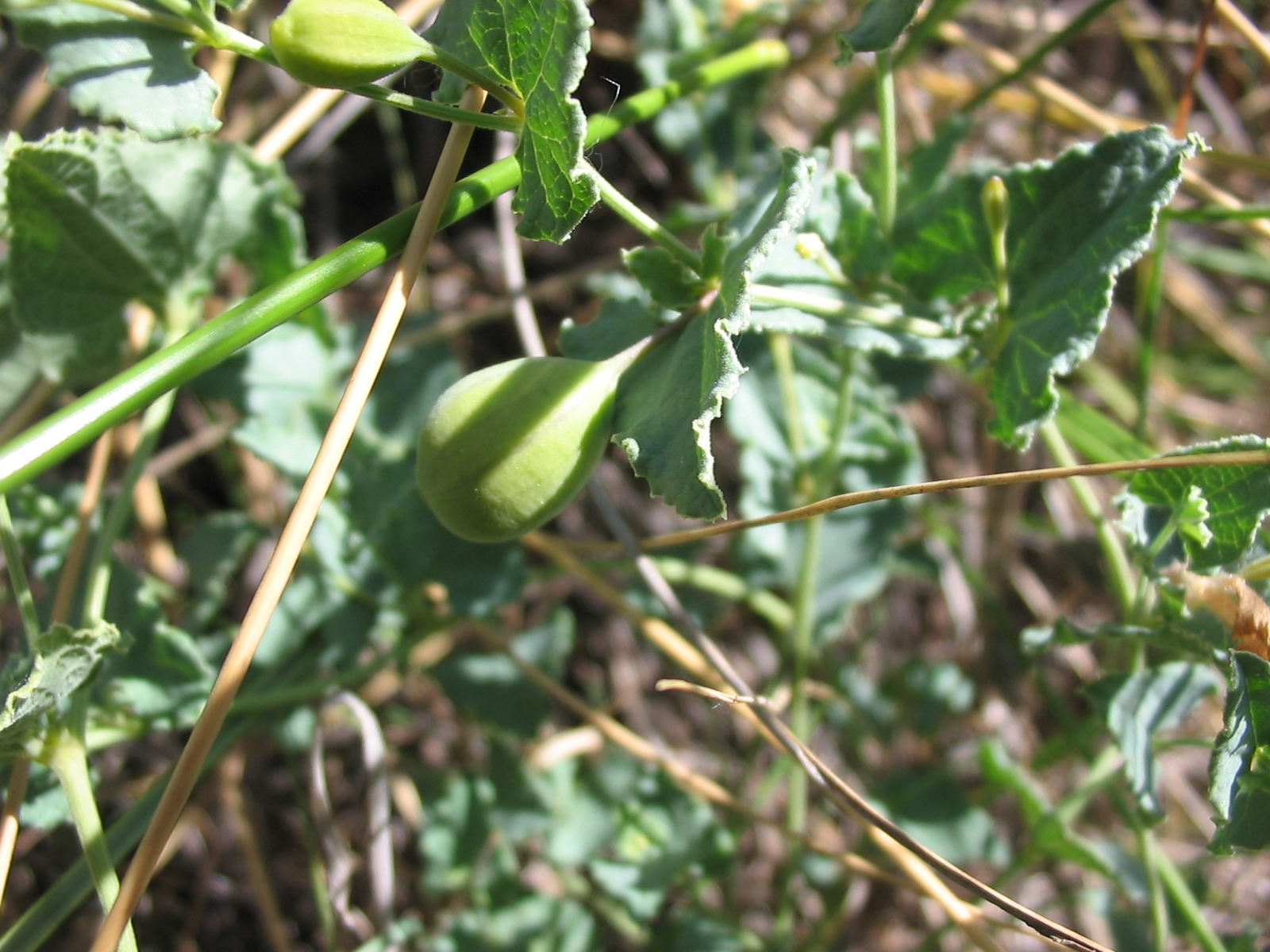

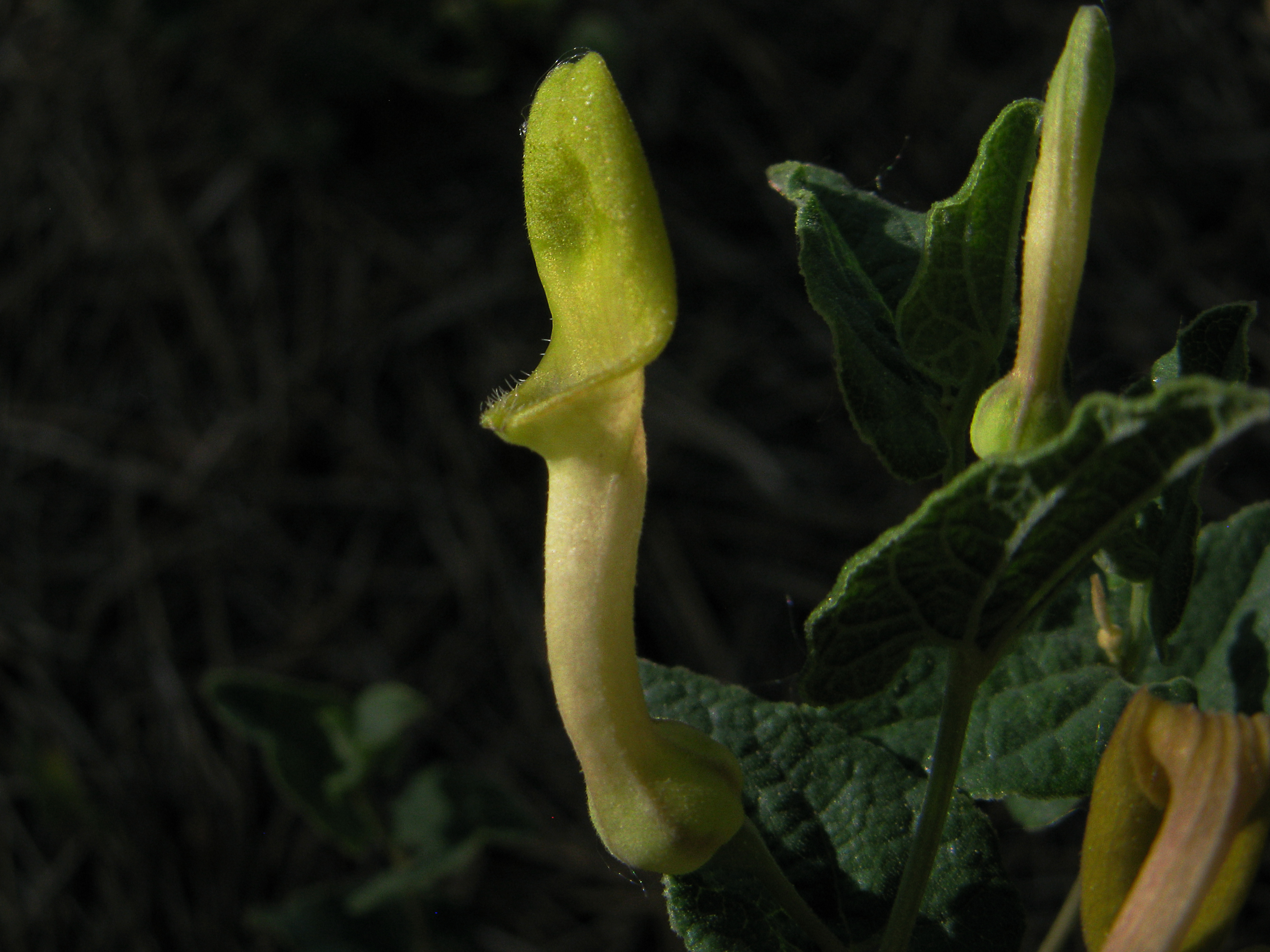
