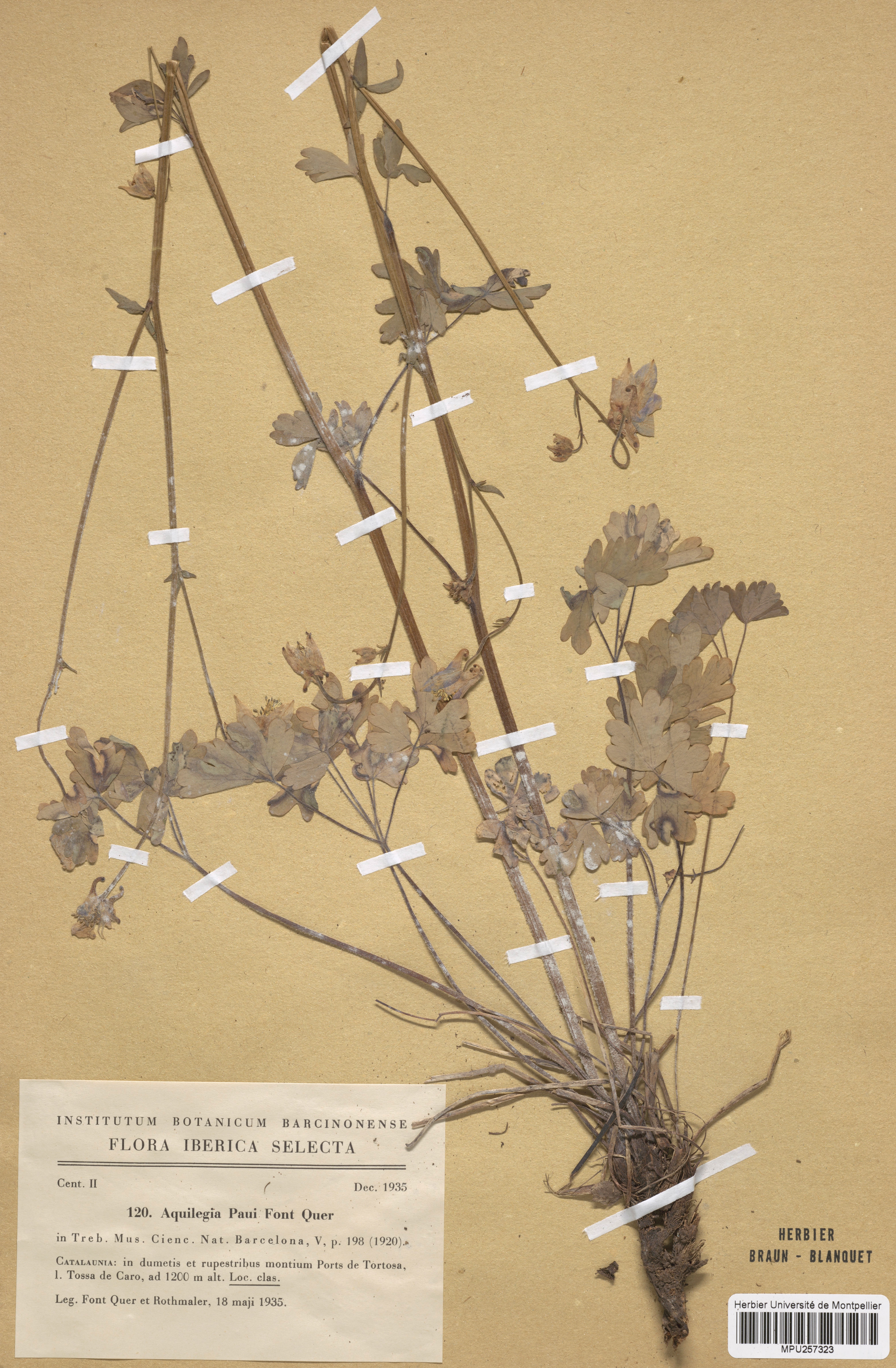
- Specimen of Aquilegia paui

Scientific classification
- Kingdom: Plantae
- Clade: Tracheophytes
- Clade: Angiosperms
- Clade: Eudicots
- Order: Ranunculales
- Family: Ranunculaceae
- Genus: Aquilegia
- Species: A. paui

Binomial name
- Aquilegia paui Font Quer

Synonyms
- Aquilegia vulgaris var. paui (Font Quer) O.Bolòs & Vigo ex Tomás Emilio Díaz

= Aquilegia paui =

Species of flowering plant

Aquilegia paui is a species of perennial flowering plant in the genus Aquilegia (columbines) in the family Ranunculaceae. The species has an extremely limited range, narrowly endemic only to the mountains of Ports de Tortosa-Beseit, a massif in the Province of Tarragona in Catalonia, northeastern Spain. Due to a herbarium filing error and the absence of observations of A. paui from 1920 until 1999, the species was long considered a subspecies or synonym of Aquilegia vulgaris.

Growing up to 20 cm (7.9 in) tall, the species blooms in May and June. The flowers are bluish-purple with pale or whitish petals. The species has a small population that, as of 2011, numbered about 2,000 individuals spread across four subpopulations. Human activity, predation by the native Southeastern Spanish ibex, and poor genetic diversity have been cited as risks to the continued survival of A. paui.

== Description ==
Aquilegia paui is a perennial herbaceous flowering plant in the genus Aquilegia (columbines) in the family Ranunculaceae. The species possesses a rootstock that can be either simple or branching. From this, one or two aerial stems will grow each year. The stems, which are glandular and pubescent (covered in small hairs), grow between 6 cm (2.4 in) and 20 cm (7.9 in) tall. The pubescence increases in density towards each stem. The basal leaves (leaves stemming from the base of the plant) are 10 mm (0.39 in) to 4 cm (1.6 in) long and borne on long petioles of 2 cm (0.79 in) to 8 cm (3.1 in) long. They emerge in rosettes and once- or bi-ternate (spreading into one or two leaflets with three lobes). The leaves are glabrous (hairless) on their topsides. On their bottom sides, they are glaucous (blue-grey) and can be either glabrous or – more rarely – glandular-pubescent. There are one to three cauline leaves (leaves attached to the aerial stems) on each stem. The cauline leaves are smaller than the basal leaves.

The inflorescences of A. paui are bracteate. Each inflorescence bears one to three flowers. The species generally blooms between mid-May and early July, though flowers have been observed in August. The flowers measure between 20 mm (0.79 in) and 30 mm (1.2 in) in diameter. Aquilegia flowers typically each have five sepals, five petals, and five carpels. Each petal has two portions: a broad portion called a blade or limb that projects forward and an elongated base that forms a structure called a nectar spur that projects backward and contains nectar. On A. paui, most flowers only possess between one and four petals and nectar production is reduced. The flowers are variable in color, with sepals and petals ranging from blue-violet to whitish with green portions. The sepals are shorter than the petals, measuring 10 mm (0.39 in) to 15 mm (0.59 in) long and 4 mm (0.16 in) to 7 mm (0.28 in) wide. The shape of the sepals can be lanceolate or ovate-lanceolate. The corolla (arrangement of the petals) measures between 15 mm (0.59 in) and 18 mm (0.71 in) in diameter, with the petals positioned in a cylindrical or obconical manner.

Aquilegia are capable of both sexual reproduction and autogamy (self-fertilization). A. paui is hermaphroditic (possessing both male and female reproductive organs), and is presumed to be primarily autogamous. Fruiting on A. paui occurs in June and July, with fruit taking a month to ripen. On each fruit, there are one to five glandular-pubescent follicles that are 12 mm (0.47 in) to 16 mm (0.63 in) long. The black, shiny seeds are arranged in rows within the follicles. A. paui plants produce significant quantities of seeds. The species does not appear to reproduce effectively through seed. Few plants fruit each year and at least 30% of fruits are lost before reaching maturity due to predation. Instead, A. paui seems more proficient at reproducing through the spreading of its rhizomes.

== Ecology ==
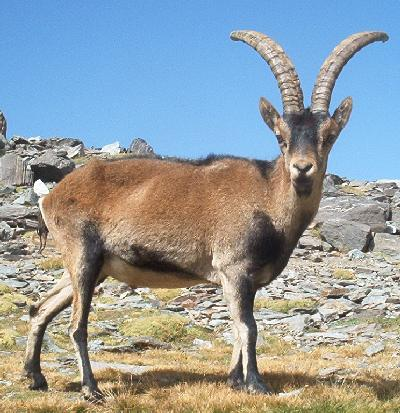
Southeastern Spanish ibex (example pictured) have been observed consuming portions of A. paui plants.

Despite its historical taxonomic subordination under the species Aquilegia vulgaris, substantial morphological differences distinguish the two species, notably that A. paui has fewer flowers and follicles, as well as smaller leaves. The species ranges overlap in Ports de Tortosa-Beseit. There, A. paui favors rockier areas near cliffs and away from other vegetation, while A. vulgaris populates moist, shady areas.

A 2011 paper described a study conducted in 2006 and 2007, in which no insects visited the observed A. paui flowers during any of the 74 15-minute-long daytime observations periods. The study recorded 102 insect visits in 67 observation periods for the observed A. vulgaris flowers nearby. The same study determined that the exposure of A. paui flowers to pollinators or solely to spontaneous self-fertilization did not impact the number of mature seeds produced per flower. In A. vulgaris, seed production was improved by open-pollination.

Within a short period, the genus Aquilegia has evolutionarily radiated. The evolution of speciation in morphological and biological differences has occurred more rapidly than genetic distinctions, permitting hybridization where cross-pollination of Aquilegia species is possible. In the case of A. paui and A. vulgaris, the likelihood of such cross-pollination is low: pollinators frequenting A. vulgaris are unlikely to visit A. paui, as the latter plants are isolated and offer less nectar.

The native Southeastern Spanish ibex, a species of goat, frequently eats A. paui. The goats eat basal leaves, flowering stems, and fruit from the plant. A personal observation assessed that goats consumed 30% of A. paui fruit before they reach maturity. As with other Aquilegia, consumption by mammals is not considered a component of A. paui's reproductive diffusion. Conservation of the goat might endanger the survival of A. paui due to overgrazing.

== Taxonomy ==
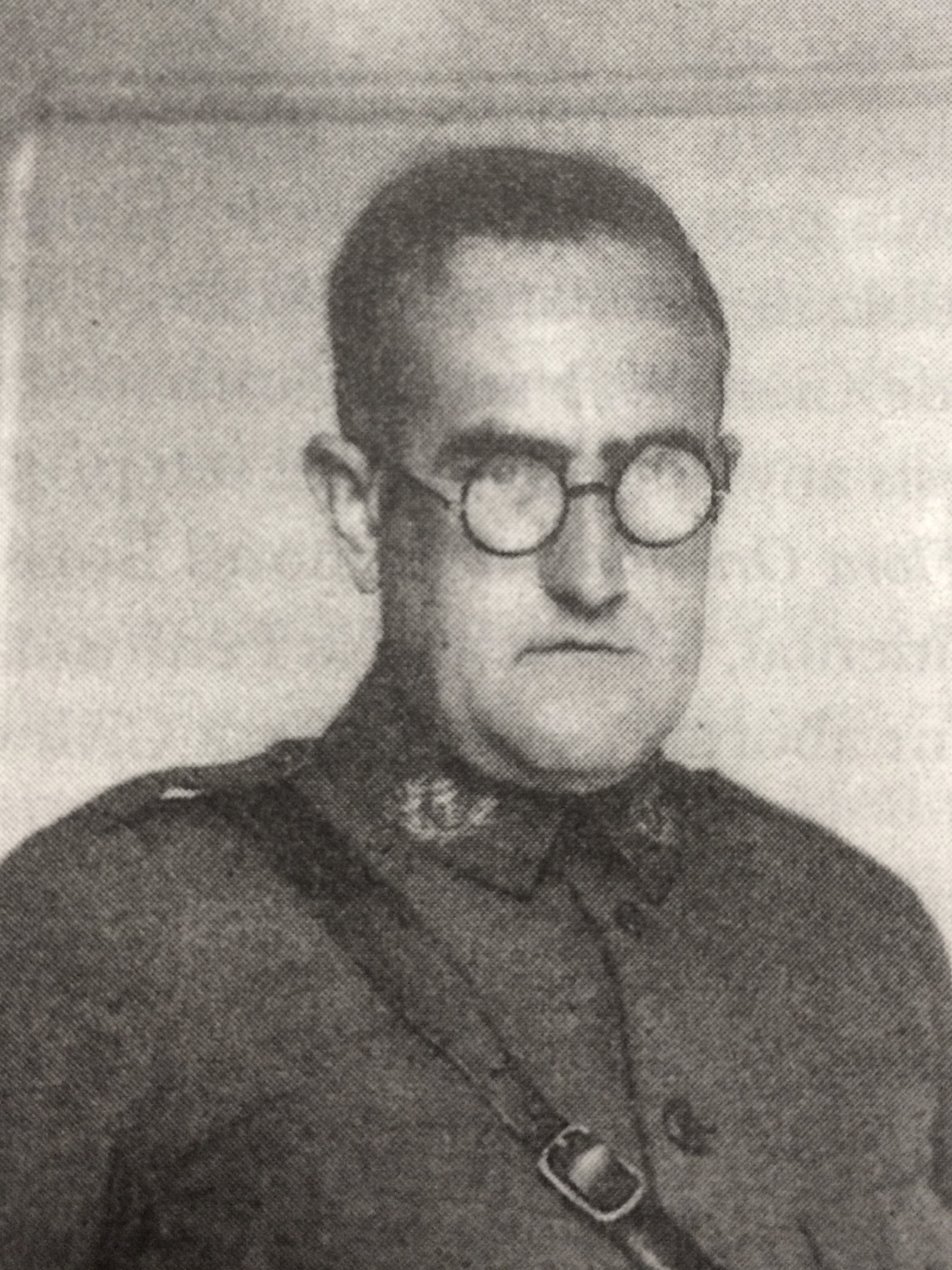
The Spanish botanist Pius Font i Quer named the species in 1917 and first described it in 1920.

Aquilegia paui was given its taxonomic name by the Catalan botanist Pius Font i Quer in 1917 in the Catalan-language journal Anuari of the Junta de Ciències Naturals de Barcelona. He first described the species in 1920 in the journal Treballs del Museu de Ciéncies Naturals de Barcelona. Font Quer produced an exsiccata specimen (no. 120), in the centuria II of his Flora Iberica Selecta series, from biological specimens he had collected. However, within this exsiccata item no. 120 distributed at the end of 1935 to a number of herbaria, specimens of A. paui and A. vulgaris collected around A. paui's type locality of Ports de Tortosa-Beseit were mistakenly mixed.

From 1920 until 1999, A. paui was not observed in the wild. Due to the mixing of the herbarium specimens, a 1984 flora of Catalonia and the 1986 Flora Iberica both reevaluated the plant as subspecies of A. vulgaris under the name A. vulgaris subsp. paui. An earlier 1971 work had synonimized the taxon with A. vulgaris, a decision the Italian botanist Enio Nardi later said was made "for no apparent reason".

After an extended period without scholarly interest, A. paui became the subject of attention following its 1999 rediscovery in the Parc Natural dels Ports, near the sites of the earlier collections. The taxon was tentatively reaccepted as a species in 2001 and 2003 based on this rediscovery. A 2007 study reconfirmed A. paui as a species following the revelation of the mistakes with Font Quer's herbarium specimens. A herbarium specimen collected in 1917 was selected to serve as the lectotype in 2014.

As of 2015, provisional assessments place A. paui within a species complex spanning France and Iberia. This complex, headed by Aquilegia viscosa, also includes Aquilegia montsicciana and Aquilegia zapateri. Of these, A. paui possesses the smallest flowers and petal limbs. These species are part of a broader complex of blue-flowering European Aquilegia that includes A. vulgaris.

=== Etymology ===
The word columbine, the common name for species in the genus, derives from the Latin word columbinus, meaning "dove", a reference to the flowers' appearance being similar to a group of doves. The genus name Aquilegia may come from the Latin word for "eagle", aquila, in reference to the petals' resemblance to eagle talons. A more likely etymology for Aquilegia is a derivation from the Latin aquam legere ("to collect water"), aquilegium (a container of water), or aquilex ("dowser" or "water-finder") in reference to the profusion of nectar in the spurs. The species is named for the Spanish botanist Carlos Pau y Español.

== Distribution ==
Aquilegia paui is found in the Province of Tarragona in Catalonia, northeastern Spain, on the Iberian Peninsula, where it is extremely narrowly endemic. As of 2008, the entire species comprised a single population across four subpopulations, with the largest of the three surveyed subpopulations numbering 300 individual plants. In 2011, the total population was about 2,000 individual plants. Each subpopulation was within a few kilometers of each other in the Ports de Tortosa-Beseit massif near its highest peak, Mont Caro. The total area covered by each subpopulation combined measures less than 1 km^{2} (0.39 sq mi).

The area where A. paui grows is mountainous. The species prefers rocky outcrops and generally populates shady, north-facing calcareous cliffs and screes. It can be found within a narrow range of elevations, with plants found between 990 m (3,250 ft) and 1,390 m (4,560 ft) above sea level.

European species of Aquilegia, particularly A. vulgaris and A. alpina, have been present in gardens for hundreds of years. In 1946, the American botanist Philip A. Munz reported that the species was not in cultivation. In 2011, a study predicted that cultivation of the species would be difficult due to poor ability of A. paui to reproduce by seed.

== Conservation ==
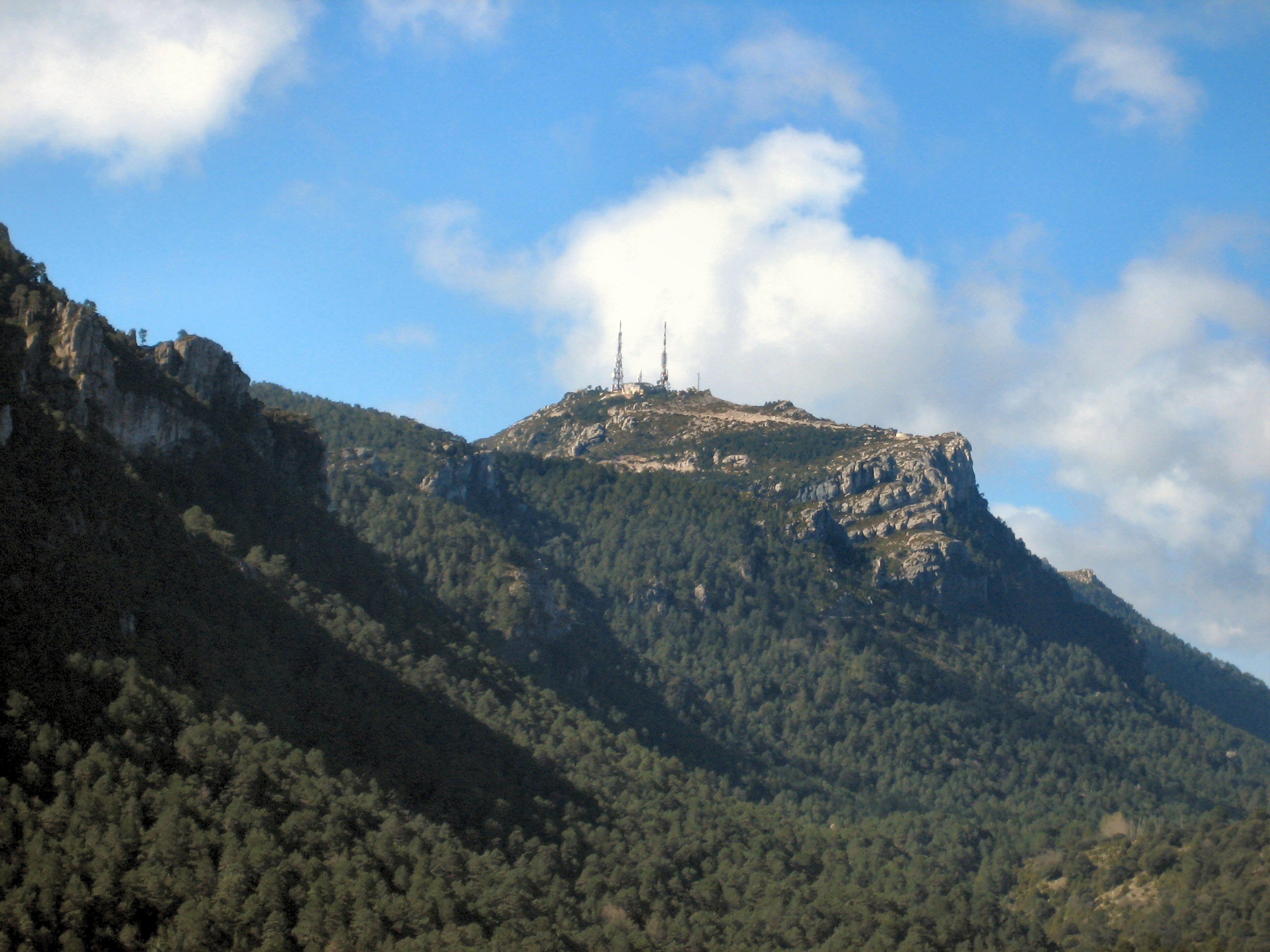
The entire native range of Aquilegia paui is within a few kilometers of Mont Caro (pictured). Construction on the mountain may have damaged an A. paui subpopulation.

As of 2025, the Royal Botanic Gardens, Kew's Plants of the World Online evaluated the extinction risk for Aquilegia paui as "threatened" with high confidence, while the IUCN Red List has not provided a conservation status. Due to its limited geographic range and rarity of reproductive plants, studies in 2001 and 2003 appraised A. paui recommended an IUCN assessment of critically endangered.

In 2011, a conservation assessment in Oryx recommended that the IUCN classify A. paui as an endangered species. The paper was based on 20 surveys performed within the species's range between 1999 and 2008, and appraised the plant as highly vulnerable. Among the risks to the species listed by the study were low genetic diversity, limited geographic distribution, encroachment by humans, and fires. The study suggested that construction of telecommunication facilities on Mont Caro may have been responsible for the drop in plants in one subpopulation between 1999 and 2007. The study argued that the active habitat conservation and ex situ conservation (preservation away from the natural range) would be necessary to prevent the extinction of A paui, but would be difficult due to the poor reproductive success of A. paui by seed. It also proposed that individual subpopulations should be supported such that they each sustain 250 reproductive individuals. The study noted that efforts to conserve the endemic Southeastern Spanish ibex could interfere in conserving A. paui, as the ibex may have overgrazed on two A. paui subpopulations.

Using the 2011 A. paui conservation assessment as an example, the Australian botanist Stephen Hopper emphasized the role of taxonomic understanding in plant conservation. Hopper pointed to the heightened risk faced by "poorly known endemics" and quoted the assessment's conclusion that A. paui was an example of plants "facing extinction in anonymity because their taxonomic status has been misunderstood or overlooked".
