= Royal Spanish Society of Natural History =

Private Spanish scientific society

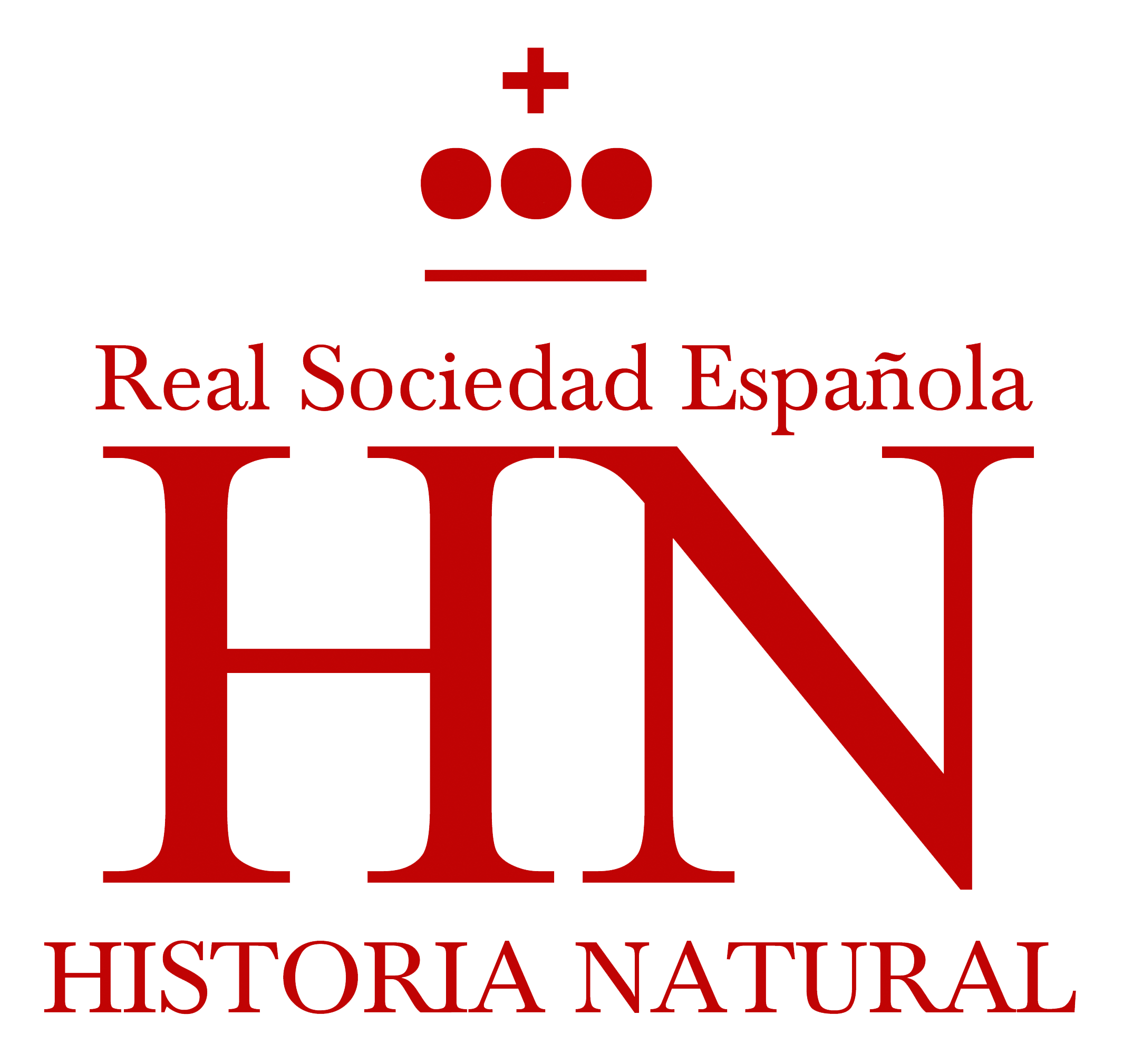
Logo of the society

The Royal Spanish Society of Natural History (Spanish: Real Sociedad Española de Historia Natural, RSEHN) is a private Spanish scientific society promoting studies in natural sciences. Founded in 1871 as the Sociedad Española de Historia Natural, it is the oldest private scientific society in Spain. It is currently headquartered at the Complutense University of Madrid. The organization has published several scientific journals, including the Anales de la Sociedad Española de Historia Natural, the Boletín de la Real Sociedad, and the Memorias de la Real Sociedad.

The organization was granted a royal title in 1903, resulting in its renaming. The organization had prolific involvement in Spanish scientific work prior to the Spanish Civil War. Following war, the subsequent exiling of many society members and the poorer state of Spanish science resulted in a significant decrease in the society's work and its publications were consolidated into only the Boletín. The society relocated to the campus of the Complutense University of Madrid in 1971. It since increased its scientific output, continuing the publication of the Boletín, restarting publication of the Memorias, and begun the publication of a magazine. It does not receive state subsidies, unlike many other similar scientific societies in Spain.

== History ==
The society was established as the Sociedad Española de Historia Natural on 15 March 1871 during a meeting held in a faculty lounge at the Instituto Industrial de Madrid in Madrid. At this first session of the society, a group of 14 naturalists that featured zoologists, botanists, and geologists – including three women and the aristocrats who funded the society – approved the society's internal regulations. The 14 founders signed a circular inviting other scientists to join the organization. Among the founders were several staunchly Catholic scientists, including the entomologist Laureano Pérez Arcas, the priest and scientist Bernardo Zapater, and the Duchess of San Sebastián and geologist Cristina Brunetti.

In 1872, the society began publishing the scientific journal Anales de la Sociedad Española de Historia Natural. The society's entomology collection was the first collection moved into the Museo Nacional de Ciencias Naturales's current building, the Industry and Fine Arts Exhibition Palace in Madrid, when it was completed in 1887. Publication of the Boletín de la Sociedad began in 1900, with the bulletin renamed to Boletín de la Real Sociedad when the society received its royal title in 1903 and was renamed as the Real Sociedad Española de Historia Natural. Also in 1903, the society began publishing its periodical Memorias de la Real Sociedad.

The years prior to the Spanish Civil War were prosperous for the society, with the additional publications Conferencias y Reseñas de la Real Sociedad and Revista Española de Biología added to the society's output in 1926 and 1932 respectively. The civil war, which ran from 1936 to 1939, and the subsequent decline in the state of Spanish science which included the exiling of society members saw the organization enter a period of decline. During this time, its publications were consolidated into the Boletín.

On the centenary of the society, in 1971, it moved to the campus of the Complutense University of Madrid. The society's activity has increased since then. In 2018, the society began publishing the magazine Aula, Museo y Colecciones de Ciencias Naturales. The society celebrated its 150th anniversary with exhibitions at the Museo Nacional de Ciencias Naturales and the Biblioteca Histórica de la Complutense in 2021 and 2022. It is the oldest private scientific society in Spain and does not receive the state subsidies common among other scientific societies in Spain.

Since its foundation, the society has had over 100,000 pages published, while maintaining uninterrupted publishing since 1901.
