= Blanca Catalán de Ocón =

Spanish botanist (1860–1904)

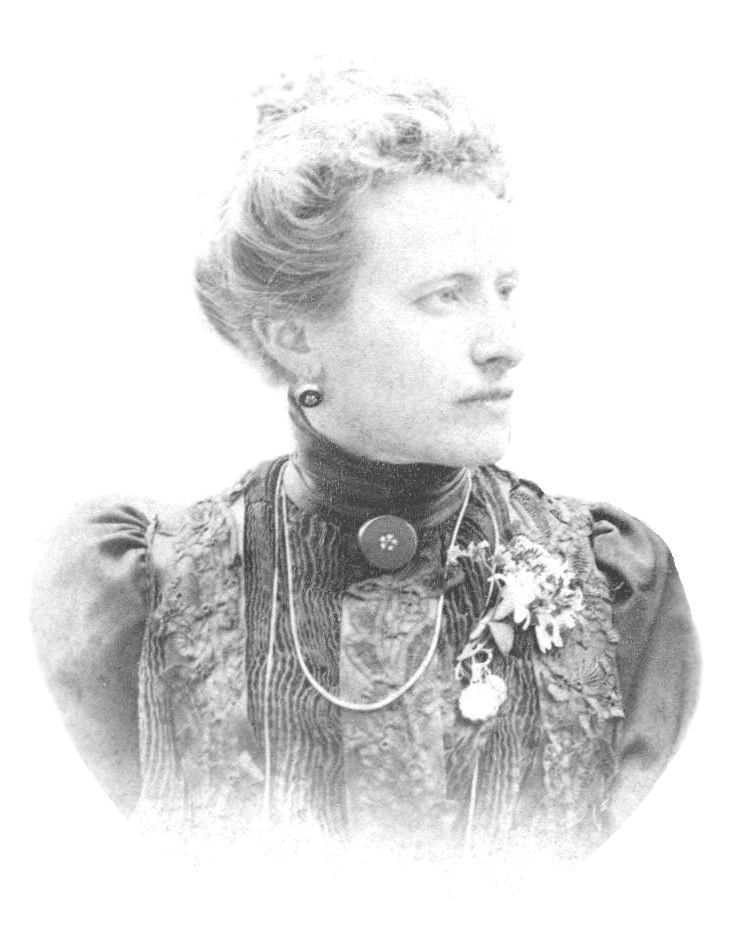
- Born: Blanca Catalán de Ocón y Gayolá; 22 August 1860; Calatayud, in the Province of Zaragoza
- Died: 17 March 1904 (aged 43); Vitoria-Gasteiz
- Known for: First woman Spanish botanist

Blanca Catalán de Ocón y Gayolá (22 August 1860 - 17 March 1904) was a Spanish botanist, considered the first woman specialist in the field in Spain.

== Early life and education ==
Blanca Catalán de Ocón y Gayolá was born on 22 August 1860 in Calatayud, in the Province of Zaragoza but from an early age lived with her family in Monreal del Campo, in Teruel. She was the eldest daughter of an aristocratic couple, Loreto de Gayolá (1839–1887) and Manuel Catalán de Ocón (1822–1899). Her mother had been educated in Switzerland, and encouraged her daughters to develop an interest in botany and entomology and instilled in them a love of nature. They spent a lot of time exploring the natural world at "La Campana" a house in Valdecabriel, in the Sierra de Albarracín. Her younger sister, Clotilde Catalán de Ocón y Gayolá, was an entomologist and became a poet. The young Blanca also wrote poetry.

== Botanical career ==
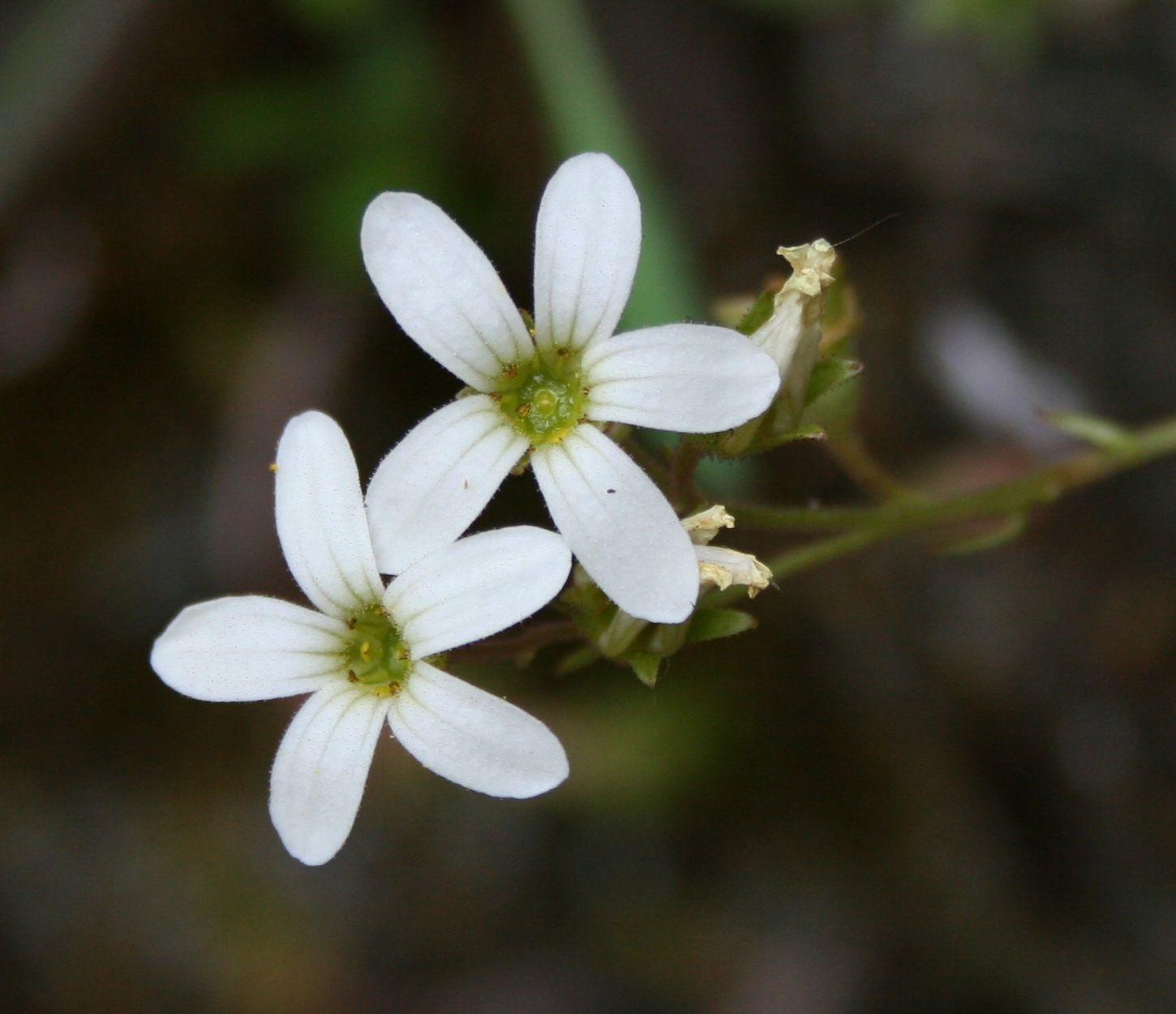
Saxifraga carpetana, named S. blanca by the botanist Heinrich Moritz Willkomm.

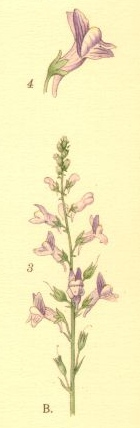
Illustration of the Linaria alba

Blanca Catalán de Ocón collected a herbarium, (preserved plant specimens and associated data used for scientific study with plants) from the Albarracín area. Some of the species had been unrecorded by science until then. The Canon of Albarracín, Bernardo Zapater, who was also a botanist, put her in contact with the German botanist Heinrich Moritz Willkomm, who was preparing his definitive book Prodromus Florae Hispanicae with Johan Martin Christian Lange. It was published in 1861–1880, under the name Prodromus Florae Hispanicae seu Synopsis Methodica omnium Plantarum in Hispania Sponte Nascentium vel Frequentius Cultarum quae Innotuerunt Auctoribus. Stuttgartiae. Willkomm included Catalán de Ocón's name amongst the main plant collectors in his work on Spanish flora, and included an illustration of the white Saxifraga Blanca on one of the coloured plates.

She was recognised by the Aragonese botanist, Francisco Loscos Bernal, making Catalán de Ocón the first Spanish botanist to have her name inscribed in universal scientific nomenclature. Loscos Bernal would cite her work in his Tratado de plantas de Aragón (Treatise on the plants of Aragon).

She was associated with the Valencian botanist Carlos Pau, who named of the species Linaria blanca (since renamed Linaria repens) after Catalán de Ocón and described some of the species she had sent him, such as Serratula albarracinensis (since renamed Klasea nudicaulis). Her work in the botanical field, unusual for a woman of her time, led to Willkomm, in a letter to Zapater in 1879, describing her as "the first botanist of Spain".

Two of her herbaria survive:

- Recuerdos de la Sierra de Albarracín. Herbario de botánica de plantas raras de Valdecabriel
- Souvenir des Aigues-Bonnes. Herbier de Botanique des plantes rares de la Vallée d'Ossau. Recuerdos de la Sierra de Albarracín.

== Personal life ==
In 1888, Blanca Catalán de Ocón y Gayolá married Enrique Ruiz del Castillo, a Cartagena judge assigned to the court in Vitoria. They had two children. She died of lung disease on 17 March 1904.

== Legacy and commemoration ==
In 2019, the writer Claudia Casanova published the novel Historia de una flor, inspired by the life of Blanca Catalán de Ocón.

In 2022, Madrid City Council named a green space in the Retiro Municipal District after her, Jardín Blanca Catalán de Ocón.

== Bibliography ==
- Botánicos turolenses de la comarca del Jiloca. III. Blanca Catalán de Ocón, Jaime Lorén, José María de, Flora Montiberica 10: 10-12 (IX-1998).
- La mujer en la ciencia a lo largo de la historia: Blanca y Clotilde Catalán de Ocón, consideradas las primeras mujeres españolas que ejercieron activamente la Botánica y la Entomología: exposición del 8 al 12 de mayo de 2006, Biblioteca Alfara del Patriarca (Valencia), José María de Jaime Lorén; Milagros Benito Hernández; Rafael Martín Algarra; Universidad Cardenal Herrera-CEU.
- La mujer en la Ciencia a lo largo de la historia: Blanca y Clotilde Catalán de Ocón, consideradas las primeras mujeres españolas que ejercieron activamente la botánica y la entomología, José María de Jaime Lorén, CEU UCH, 2006.
- Catálogo de las plantas colectadas por la Srta. Blanca Catalán de Ocón en el Valle de Valdecabriel; Miscelánea Turolense, p. 20, Madrid, 1894.
