= Aquilegia hispanica =

Scientific classification
- Kingdom: Plantae
- Clade: Tracheophytes
- Clade: Angiosperms
- Clade: Eudicots
- Order: Ranunculales
- Family: Ranunculaceae
- Genus: Aquilegia
- Species: A. hispanica

Binomial name
- Aquilegia hispanica (Willk.) Borbás

Synonyms
- Aquilegia vulgaris subsp. hispanica (Willk.) Heywood; Aquilegia vulgaris var. hispanica Willk.

Species of flowering plant

Aquilegia hispanica is a perennial flowering plant in the family Ranunculaceae, native to the Iberian peninsula.

== Description ==
Aquilegia hispanica is a perennial herbaceous plant similar in appearance to Aquilegia vulgaris. It has a slender stature with stems that are downy from the base and slightly sticky branches and leaf stalks. The leaves are densely velvety on the upper side, and smooth and greyish underneath. The flowers are violet-blue, smaller than those of A. vulgaris, with a slightly hooked nectar spur.

== Taxonomy ==
Aquilegia hispanica was originally described as a variety hispanica of Aquilegia vulgaris by the German botanist Heinrich Moritz Willkomm in 1880. It was reassessed as a distinct species by the Hungarian botanist Vincze von Borbás in 1882, and is now generally accepted as such, despite Vernon Heywood's assessment of it in 1961 as a subspecies hispanica of A. vulgaris.

=== Etymology ===
The specific epithet hispanica means "from Spain, Spanish, Hispanic" in Latin, referring to its native range.

== Distribution and habitat ==
Aquilegia hispanica is native to the north and west of the central Iberian peninsula, in both Portugal and Spain. It grows in meadows, forests, and woods in shaded rocky places, in mountainous and subalpine areas.

== Conservation ==
As of January 2025, the species has not been assessed for the IUCN Red List.

== Ecology ==
Aquilegia hispanica flowers in May and June. It is a characteristic part of the ground layer in deciduous Quercus pyrenaica (Pyrenean oak) forests, growing alongside other forest herbs such as Arenaria montana (mountain sandwort), the birthwort Aristolochia paucinervis, Luzula forsteri (southern wood-rush), Primula veris subsp. canescens (cowslip), and Veronica officinalis (heath speedwell).
