= Moscardón =

Moscardón, Spain
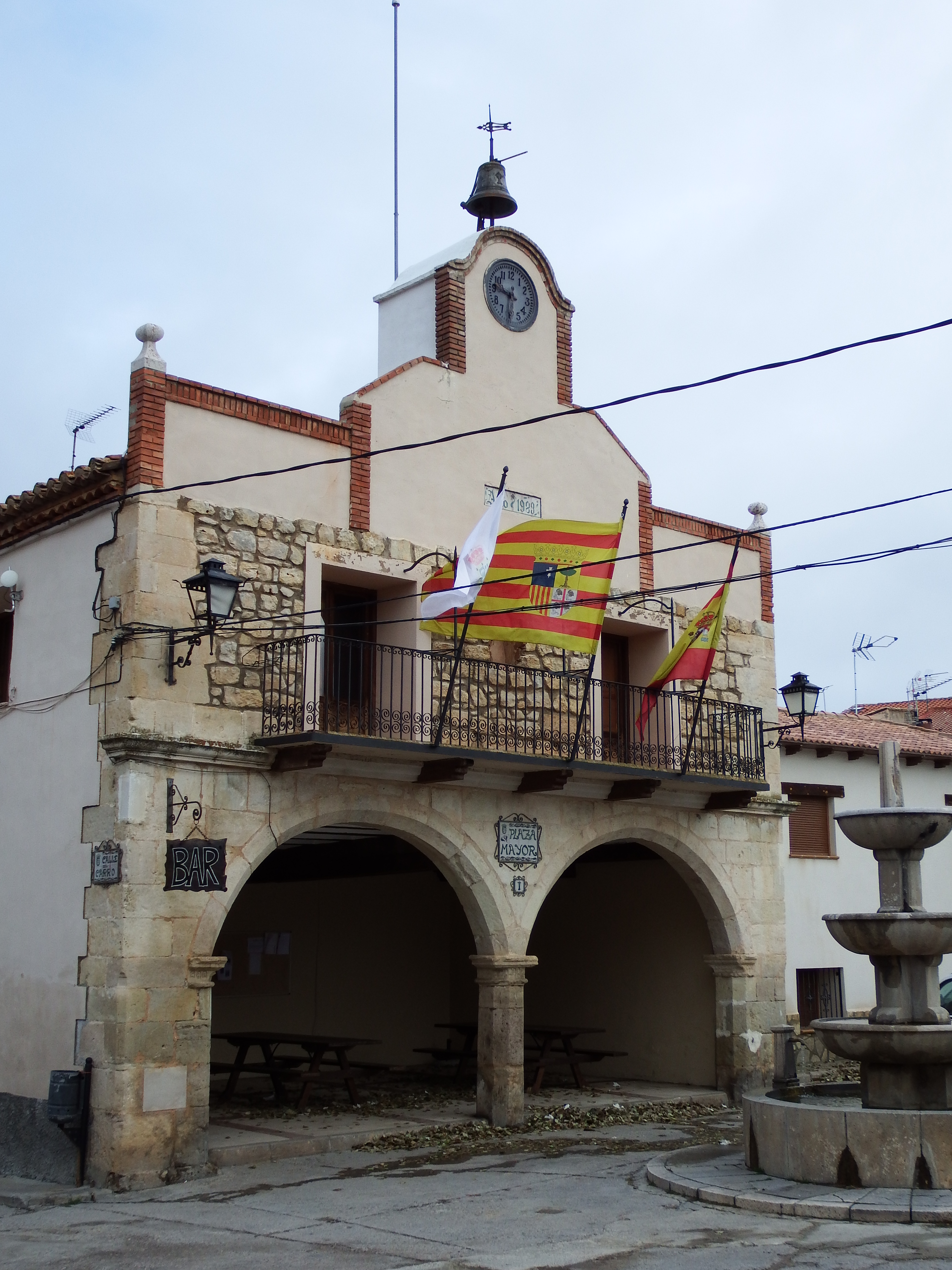
- Town hall

- Coat of arms

- Location within Spain
- Coordinates: 40°20′N 1°32′W
- Country: Spain
- Autonomous community: Aragon
- Province: Teruel
- Municipality: Moscardón

Area
  - Total: 26.99 km^{2} (10.42 sq mi)
- Elevation: 1,415 m (4,642 ft)

Population (2025-01-01)
  - Total: 62
  - Density: 2.3/km^{2} (5.9/sq mi)
- Time zone: UTC+1 (CET)
  - Summer (DST): UTC+2 (CEST)

Moscardón is a municipality located in the province of Teruel, Aragon, Spain. At the 2004 census (INE), the municipality had a population of 51 inhabitants.

== See also ==
- List of municipalities in Teruel
