= Aquilegia dichroa =

Scientific classification
- Kingdom: Plantae
- Clade: Tracheophytes
- Clade: Angiosperms
- Clade: Eudicots
- Order: Ranunculales
- Family: Ranunculaceae
- Genus: Aquilegia
- Species: A. dichroa

Binomial name
- Aquilegia dichroa Freyn

Synonyms
- Aquilegia vulgaris subsp. dichroa (Freyn) T.E.Díaz; Aquilegia dichroa var. molleriana Borbás & Freyn ex Mariz; Aquilegia molleriana (Borbás & Freyn ex Mariz) T.Durand & B.D.Jacks.

European columbine species

Aquilegia dichroa is a perennial flowering plant in the family Ranunculaceae, native to Portugal and northwestern Spain.

== Description ==
Aquilegia dichroa is a perennial herb growing to 18–75 cm (7–30 in) tall with an erect stem which is pubescent towards the top and sticky towards the base. The leaves are green and smooth on the uppersides, and slightly downy underneath. The basal leaves have stalks 4–18 cm (1.6–7.1 in) long, the leaves themselves measuring 6–7 cm (2.4–2.8 in) long by 7–12 cm (2.8–4.7 in) wide. Each has three wedge- or egg-shaped leaflets, of which the central leaflet always and the side leaflets sometimes have a stalk. The flowers are blue, nodding and have pointed oval sepals 1.5 cm (0.6 in) long, and blue petals 2 cm (0.8 in) long with white tips. The petals have thick, blue, curved nectar spurs which are hooked at the end and 1.2 cm (0.5 in) long. The stamens are longer than the petals, and the anthers are yellow, blackening towards the tip.

== Taxonomy ==
Aquilegia dichroa was formally described by the Austrian botanist Josef Franz Freyn in 1880. Freyn differentiated the species from the similar Aquilegia vulgaris by its small sepals, protruding stamens, hooked styles, and evenly if not densely hairy leaves. It was reassessed as a subspecies dichroa of A. vulgaris by the Spanish botanist Tomás Emilio Díaz in 1984.

A closely related species A. molleriana was described by Freyn and Vinczé von Borbás in 1886 but is now considered a synonym of A. dichroa.

=== Etymology ===
The specific epithet dichroa means "of two colours", referring to the blue-and-white flowers.

== Distribution and habitat ==
Aquilegia dichroa is native to Portugal and northwestern Spain, and has been introduced to the islands of Terceira, Graciosa, and Pico in the Azores. It grows in mountainous areas in granitic soils.

== Conservation ==
As of December 2024, the species has not been assessed for the IUCN Red List.

== Ecology ==
Aquilegia dichroa flowers from April to June. In mainland Portugal it is found in the oak-wood plant community Rusco aculeati-Quercetum roboris (butcher's-broom and pedunculate oak) along with plants such as Scilla verna (spring squill), Veronica chamaedrys (germander speedwell), Hieracium sabaudum (European hawkweed), and Melampyrum pratense (common cow-wheat).
