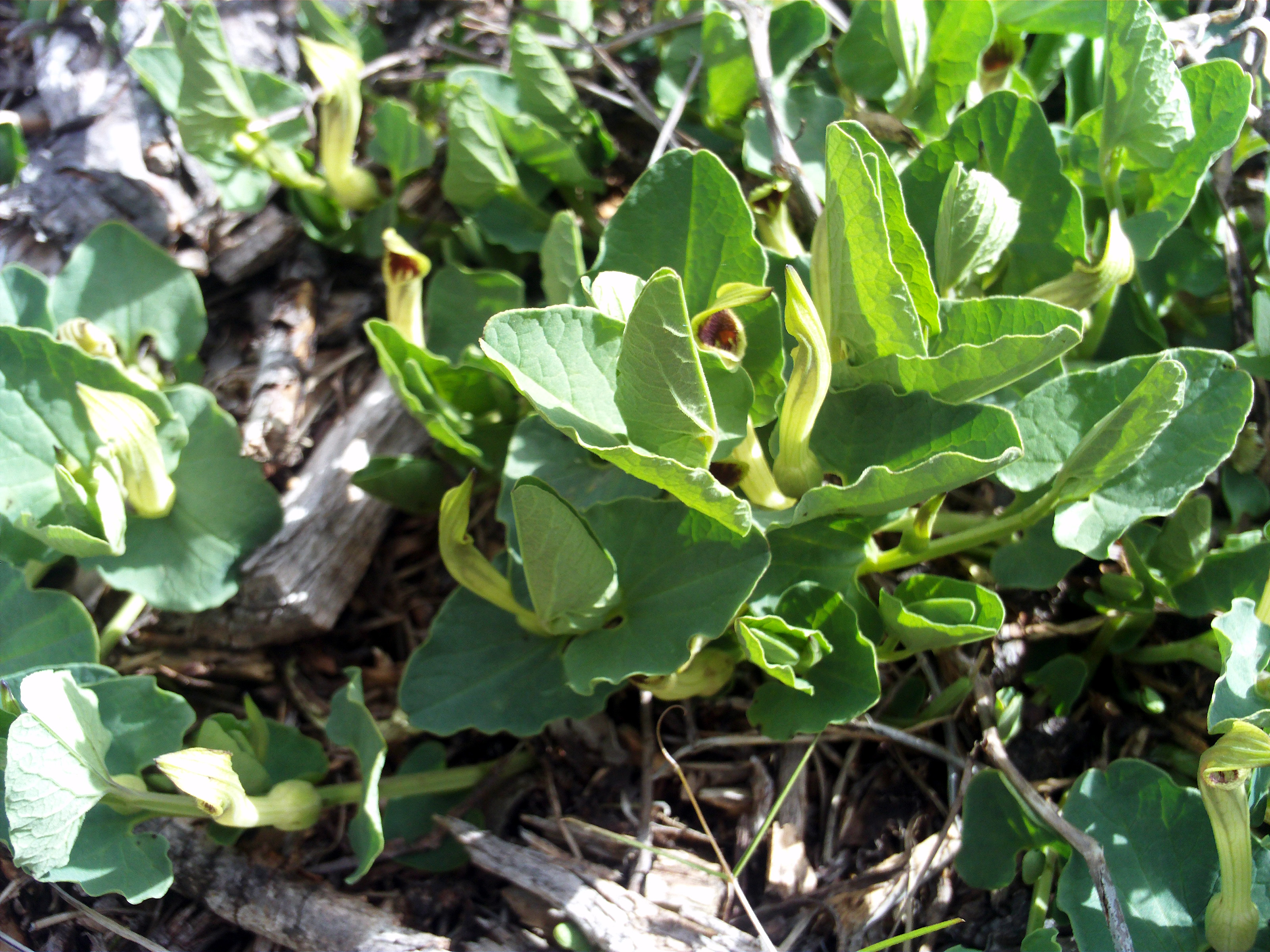

Conservation status
- Least Concern (IUCN 3.1)

Scientific classification
- Kingdom: Plantae
- Clade: Tracheophytes
- Clade: Angiosperms
- Clade: Magnoliids
- Order: Piperales
- Family: Aristolochiaceae
- Genus: Aristolochia
- Species: A. paucinervis

Binomial name
- Aristolochia paucinervis Pomel

Synonyms
- Aristolochia longa var. pseudorotunda Maire; Aristolochia longa subsp. paucinervis (Pomel) Batt.; Aristolochia longa var. parviflora Maire & Weiller; Aristolochia pallida auct. non Willd.

= Aristolochia paucinervis =

Species of plant

Aristolochia paucinervis is a herbaceous plant in the family Aristolochiaceae endemic to the western Mediterranean Basin.

== Description ==
Aristolochia paucinervis is a perennial geophyte plant. Its saxophone-shaped flowers are used to attract their pollinators (flies).

== Taxonomy ==
The genus name Aristolochia is comprised the ancient Greek words Aristos and Lochia which translate to "best" and "childbirth" respectively due to its historic uses in traditional medicine where the roots were used as a stimulant used during childbirth to promote labour. The authority of the species is Pomel, who first published the species in Nouveau Materiaux pour la Flore Atlantique 1874. Aristolochia paucinervis is also commonly referred to as 'Barraztam' in Morocco.

== Plant description ==
Aristolochia paucinervis is a climbing perennial vine plant that can grow up to heights of 0.5m in the understory of the forest. The plant has simple, smooth, broad leaves 3-5cm wide with a triangular-oval blade shape and palmate veins. This plant possesses a tuber which acts as storage for the plant.

== Flower description ==
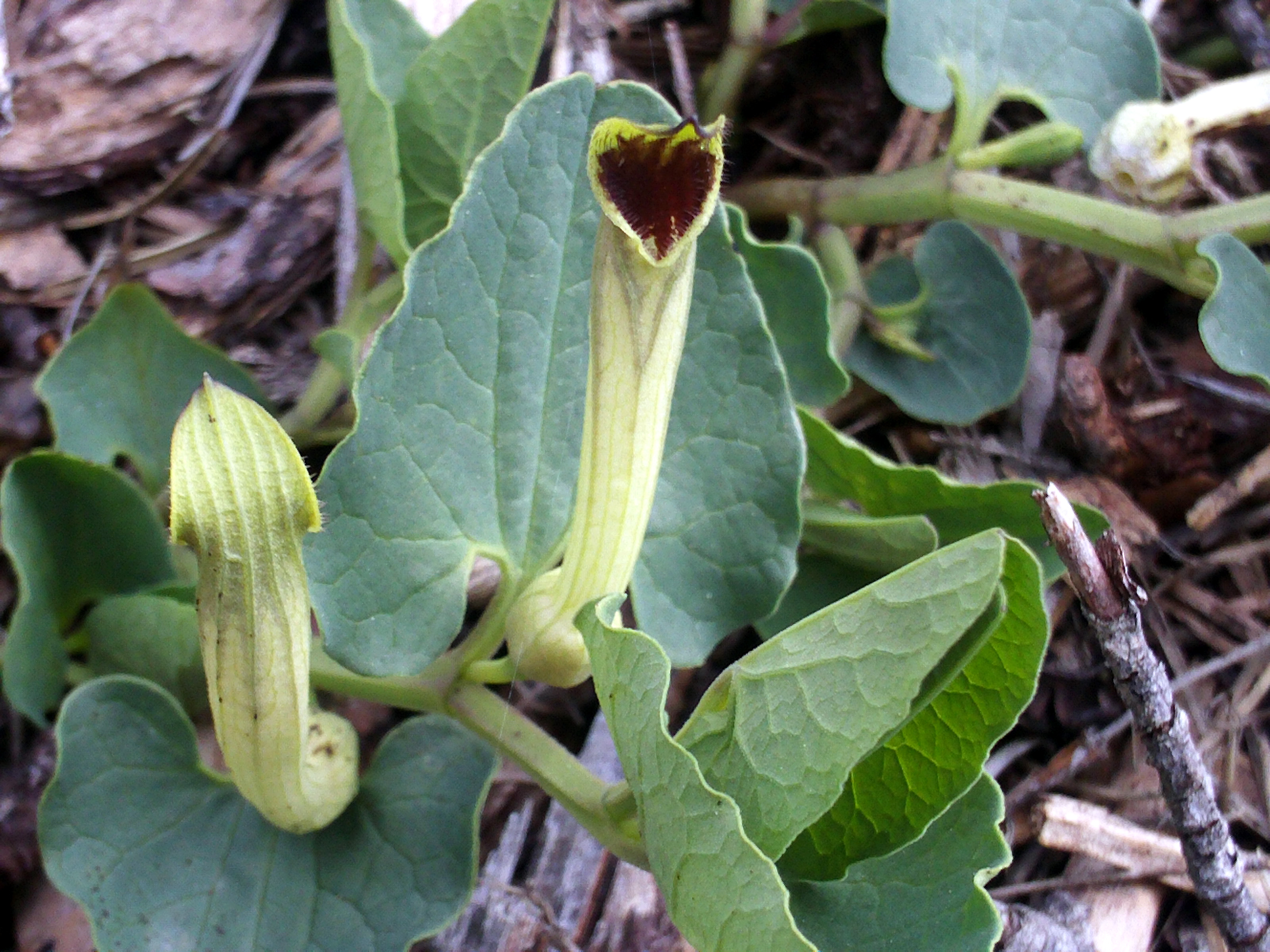
Flower close-up

The flowers have two different phenotypes: yellow-white flowers and brown-purple flowers. The flower is protogynous which means that the male reproductive organs and female reproductive organs develop at different times to prevent self-fertilization. The flowers has a tube shaped perianth derived from a modified calyx. The perianth forms a reproductive structure known as the gynostemium which houses the fused styles, stigmata and anthers. Flowers produce around 2100 pollen grains and 42 ovules.

== Pollination mechanism ==
Aristolochia paucinervis undergoes pollination by exuding a strong smell that attracts small Diptera (flies) into its tube shaped periant. The flies remain trapped as the hairs prevent them from escaping for a period of time. When the anthers mature, pollen is deposited onto the fly and the hairs inside the tube wither which allow the insect to escape and pollinate another flower.

The pollination mechanism is said to be deceptive because the pollinators are saprophagous which means that they feed on decaying matter and do not feed on the nectar or pollen that is provided by the plant.

== Fruit ==
After flowering, the stigma and perianth wilt, exposing the ovary on the plant. The ovary then develops into a capsular fruit up to 3cm in length which contains around 11 large seeds.

== Distribution and habitat ==
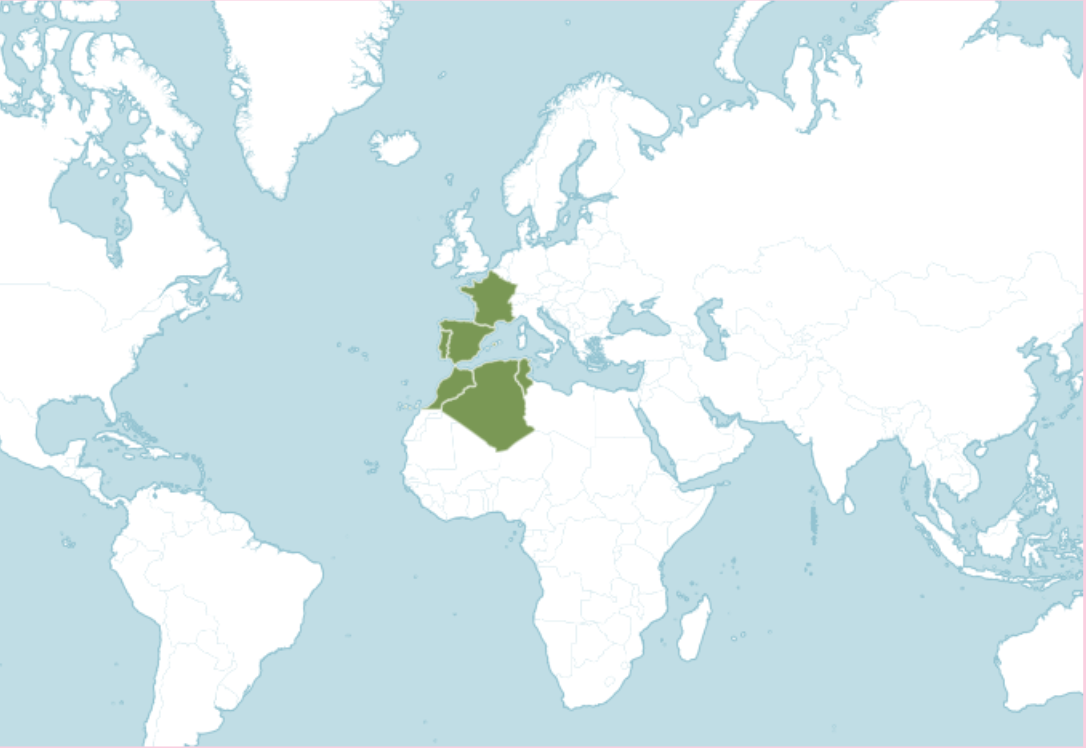
A map showing the native range of the plant

Aristolochia paucinervis is widely distributed throughout the western Mediterranean, including Madeira and the Canary Islands of Macaronesia, Morocco, the Iberian Peninsula (most of Portugal and primarily southern Spain), the Balearic Islands, southern France, a small part of Algeria and is thought to be extinct in Tunisia.

It can be found at elevations between 500 - 2,500m.

It grows in sandy and stony pastures, meadows, rocky cliffs, scrub, woodlands clearings, cultivated fields, weed of crops, wood grassy mountains and Mediterranean forest and prefers moist humid to dry substrates, stony, clay and sandy soils, relatively poor with a basic pH.

== Traditional uses ==
Traditional uses of Aristolochia paucinervis include its role in Moroccan medicine, where it is locally known as "Barraztam". The powdered root or rhizome of Aristolochia paucinervis is mixed with salted smen - this mixture can be applied topically to treat skin infections, injuries and gas gangrene, or ingested with honey or salted butter to treat abdominal pain and upper respiratory tract infections.

== Medicinal uses ==
Aristolochia paucinervis has several medicinal uses. Ingesting the dried powdered root of Aristolochia paucinervis is used as a treatment of aortic palpitations, constipation, intestinal disorders, colic, gas gangrene, and as a poison antidote for snakebites. Additionally, the methanol extract from the leaves of Aristolochia paucinervis has anti-fungal properties and is effective against pathogenic fungi responsible for skin diseases and infections such as tinea, dermatitis, and mycoses. The most susceptible fungi were Epidermophyton floccosum and Trichophyton violaceum in contrast to Trichophyton mentagrophytes and Trichophyton rubrum which were less sensitive to the fractions tested. The leaves of Aristolochia paucinervis possess antibacterial activity - in a study conducted by Gadhi et al., Aristolochia paucinervis exhibited activity against Clostridium perfringens, Clostridioides difficile, Enterococcus faecalis, Micrococcus luteus, and Bacillus subtilis, as seen by the minimum inhibitory concentration. The whole plant of Aristolochia paucinervis can be used externally to treat ringworm and wounds when dried and pulverized. Plants of the Aristolochiaceae family contain aristolochic acids (AAs) - this compound has a long history of use in herbal medicine that dates back to the 5th century in China and even earlier in Europe. The presence of AA in the roots of the plant stimulates white blood cell activity and speeds wound healing. AAs are also used to treat tuberculosis, hepatitis, liver cirrhosis, and infantile pneumonia.

== Anticancer compounds ==
In addition to its many medicinal uses, Aristolochia paucinervis exhibits anti-cancer properties. Research has suggested that Aristolochia paucinervis contains a peptide, EnnA, that directly inhibits HSP90, a cell protector hijacked by cancer to avoid being attacked by the immune system. Thus, by inhibiting HSP90, EnnA allows the immune system to respond to cancer cells. Despite its cytotoxic effects against cancer cell lines and apoptosis-induced pathways, the preparation of Aristolochia paucinervis for cancer is banned in many countries.

== Toxic compounds and toxicity ==
Although there are few reports of acute human or animal poisoning by the Aristolochia paucinervis, plants of the Aristolochiaceae family are considered dangerous when consumed over long periods of time as the roots contain aristolochic acids (AAs). AAs are responsible for renal damage due to their nephrotoxic effects. When taken internally, AAs can be carcinogenic - rhizomes used over a long period of time can cause irreversible kidney damage, haematuria, and limb paralysis.

== Conservation ==
The plant is categorized as Least Concern by the International Union for Conservation of Nature (IUCN). There are currently no conservation tactics in place. However, to maintain the species it is recommended to protect the habitats by reducing human threats like coastal development, random cutting, overgrazing, local collection practices, tourism, irregular fires, deforestation, and trampling. Although a population decline is seen at some sites such as North Africa (Morocco and Algeria), the overall population trend is stable.
