= Clotilde Catalán de Ocón =

Spanish poet and entomologist (1863–1946)

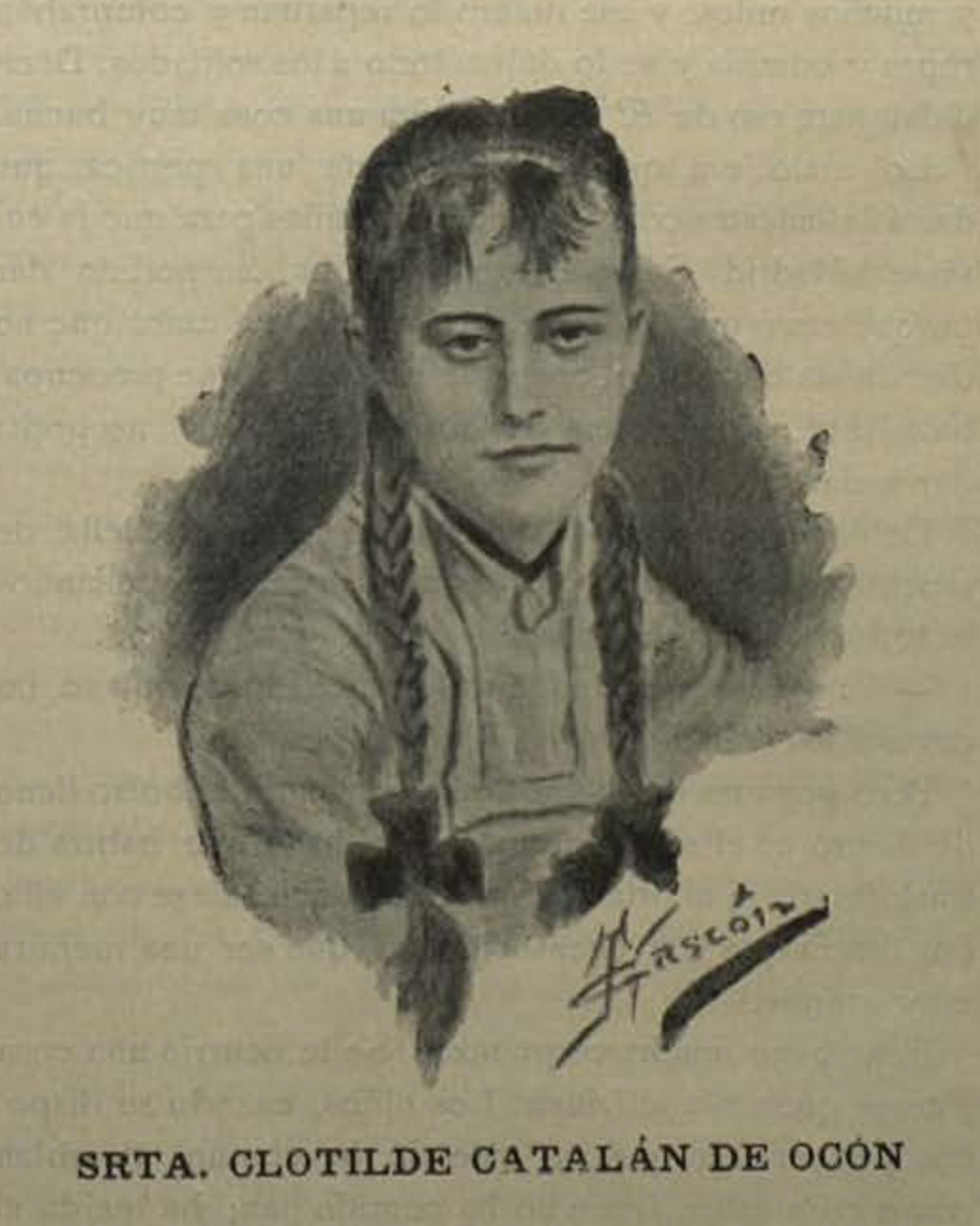
- Born: Clotilde Catalán de Ocón y Gayolá; 1 March 1863; Calatayud, Spain
- Died: 12 May 1946 (aged 83); Barcelona
- Known for: Poet; first Spanish woman entomologist

Clotilde Catalán de Ocón y Gayolá (1 March 1863 – 12 May 1946) was a Spanish entomologist and poet, noted for her study of lepidoptera in the Sierra de Albarracín. She was the first Spanish woman to actively practice entomology, and was the author of several poems under the pseudonym La Hija del Cabriel. Her older sister, Blanca Catalán de Ocón y Gayolá, became the first Spanish female botanist.

== Early life and education ==
Clotilde Catalán de Ocón y Gayolá was born in Calatayud in the Province of Zaragoza on 1 March 1863 to Loreto de Gayolá (1839–1887) and Manuel Catalán de Ocón (1822–1899), members of an aristocratic Aragonese family. She spent most of her childhood and youth in Monreal del Campo, her father's ancestral village. The family spent long periods of time at "La Campana", a house they owned in Valdecabriel, sited between the municipalities of El Vallecillo and Frías de Albarracín, Teruel, in the Sierra de Albarracín. Her mother had been educated in Switzerland, and encouraged her two daughters, Clotilde and Blanca, to develop their interests in botany and entomology and instilled in them a love of nature.

== Entomology ==
Although Clotilde Catalán did not pursue formal studies, she trained with Bernardo Zapater y Marconell, Canon of Albarracín and one of the greatest botanical scholars in Spain, who put her in contact with other scientists working in field. She became a notable collector of insects and formed a collection of lepidoptera that she gradually classified. Part of this collection was published in the journal Miscelánea Turolense in 1894, under the epigraph Fauna entomológica turolense with the subtitle Catálogo de Lepidópteros que han sido cazados en el Valle de Valdecabriel por la Señorita Clotilde Catalán de Ocón. The piece was published under Bernardo Zapater's name, and was a list of 54 butterflies with their corresponding scientific names. It emphasised the importance of Catalán's entomological collection. Zapater wrote in the article that "The young and distinguished Miss Clotilde Catalán de Ocón ... has attracted the attention of entomologists for the rare species she has been able to capture in the Valdecabriel Valley, being able to cite among many others, Colias Edussa, Hyale, Polyommatus Gordius, Lyaena Baetica and Coridon, Lyccena Damon, Melitaca Artemis, a beautiful Melitacca, Parthenie very rare in our country, and Coenonympha iphioides which is a very interesting subalpine variety".

== Poetry ==
Catalán was a poet as well as an entemologist, and wrote from childhood until well into the twentieth century. She was best known amongst her contemporaries for her work as a poet. References to the area in which she lived abound in her texts, with references to “A mi valle”, “El sueño del Cabriel” and “La sierra de Albarracín”, and also featured in her elegies Súplica, Tristeza, Cantares, Del Pasado, Ayer y Hoy o Adiós a Valdecabriel. She signed them all as La Hija del Cabriel (The daughter of Cabriel). Her pastoral poems revolved around human virtues and the sensations perceived during contact with nature. She regularly featured in the contemporary press under the pseudonym of "La hija del Cabriel", with compositions of a romantic and melancholic nature. On 1 February 1888, the Revista del Turia published her Contestación a la poesía 'El ruiseñor de mi jardín', publicada por D. José Mª Catalán en un periódico de Alcañiz. In El Turolense, she published A mi valle, A Manolita y José María, Adiós al valle, No te olvido... She published A una mosca in El Eco de Teruel, Ante la tumba de mi madre (To a fly in El Eco de Teruel, Before my mother's grave) in Miscelánea turolense, (a magazine published in Madrid between 1891-1901, which showcased the culture of the province of Teruel including articles on botany). Other writings were published in the Cancionero de los Amantes de Teruel.

== Later life ==
After the death of her mother in 1887 and of her sister Blanca in 1904, she moved to Figueras to a property belonging to her mother's family. Although she had maintained a close relationship with Blanca, Catalan gradually lost contact with her nephews, nieces and brother-in-law following her sister's early death at only 43. After living for a time in Madrid, she settled permanently in Barcelona and died there, at the age of eighty-three, on 12 May 1946. She was buried in the family vault in the Figueras cemetery.

== Commemoration ==
Catalán made some real estate investments in the Ciudad Lineal on the outskirts of Madrid. For many years there was a street in the area dedicated to "Clotilde Catalán", which was still in existence in the mid-1950s, although it was later renamed.
