= Heinrich Moritz Willkomm =

German botanist (1821–1895)

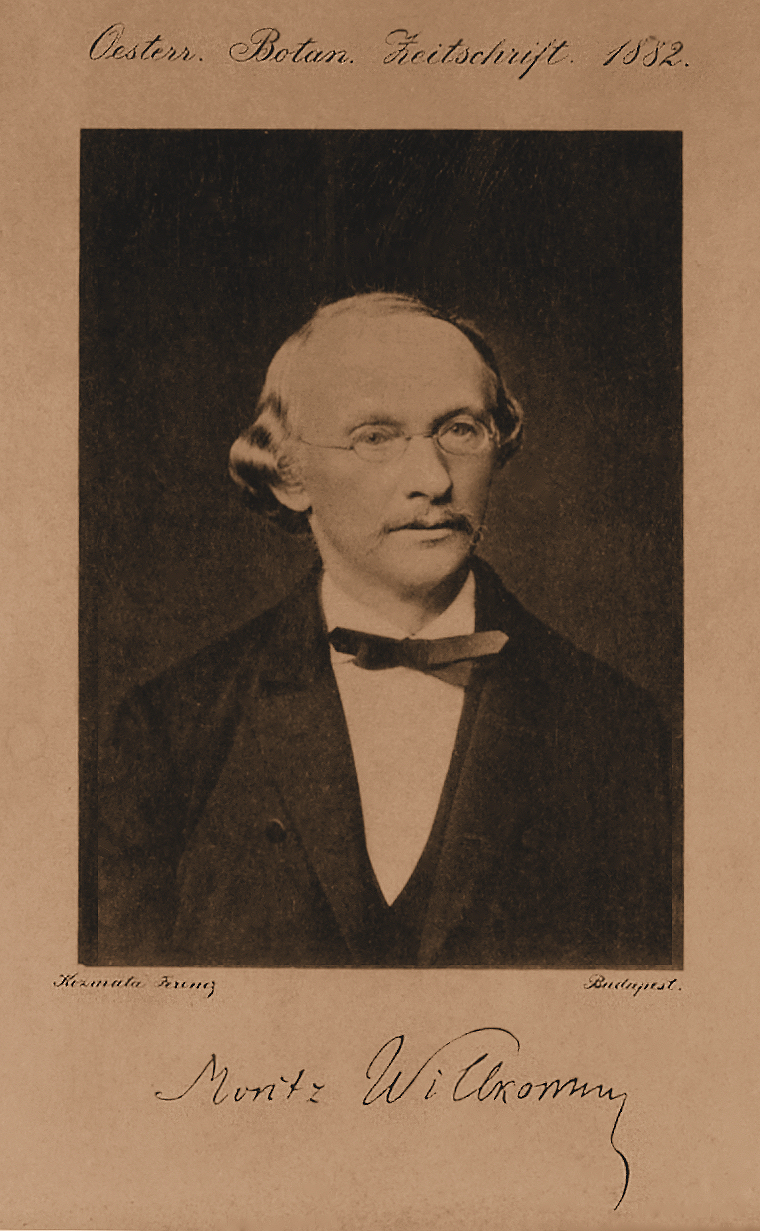
Heinrich Moritz Willkomm

Heinrich Moritz Willkomm (29 June 1821, Herwigsdorf – 26 August 1895, Schloss Wartenberg in Wartenberg am Rollberg, Bohemia) was a German botanist who served as a professor of botany at Tharandt, the Imperial University of Dorpat and at the University of Prague. He travelled widely across Spain and Portugal and became a specialist on the flora of the Iberian region. The standard author abbreviation Willk. is used to indicate this person as the author when citing a botanical name.

== Life and work ==
Willkomm was born in Herwigsdorf where his father Karl Gottlob was a theologian and Protestant pastor. After studies at the parsonage of his father he went to the Zittau Gymnasium. A meeting with Julius Christian von Flotow in 1836 made him interested in botany. He studied medicine at the University of Leipzig in 1841 and here he was influenced by Gustav Kunze. He was prosecuted in 1844 and forced to leave Leipzig due to his associations with the Burschenschaft. With Kunze's support he travelled around Spain and Portugal, collecting plants which were edited and distributed in an exsiccata series by G. Kunze. Willkomm returned to Leipzig in 1847. He continued studies and received a doctorate in 1850 with a thesis on the classification of the Globulariaceae. He travelled again into the Basque country and when he returned, he received a position at the university in 1852. He married Clara Angélica Contius. He was appointed professor of natural history in the Forestry School at Tharandt (1855). In 1868 he was appointed professor of botany and director of the botanical garden at the Imperial University of Dorpat, and from 1874 to 1892, maintained similar roles at the University of Prague. Between 1878 and 1879 he corresponded with Aragonese Spanish botanist Blanca Catalán de Ocón y Gayolá and considered her "la primera botánica de España", and cited her work in his publication on the flora of Spain written with Danish botanist Johan Lange, the Prodromus Florae Hispanicae.

In 1844–45 and 1850–51, Willkomm collected plants in Spain and Portugal. After 1844 he issued the exsiccata-like specimen series H. M. Willkommii iter hispanicum pl. exsicc. After 1850 he edited and distributed the exsiccata Iter Hispanicum Secundum. His main herbarium from these expeditions is kept in Coimbra and his personal herbarium was taken to Genoa. Following his tenure at Dorpat, he embarked on a scientific excursion to the Balearic Islands accompanied by Richard Fritze (1841-1903), Moritz Winkler (1812-1899) and Christoph Friedrich Hegelmaier (1834-1906).

His book Die Wunder des Mikroskops ("The Miracles of the Microscope"; 1856, 4th ed. 1878) contributed to the growing movement to popularize science in Germany.

The grass genus Willkommia (family Poaceae) is named in his honor. He is also honoured in the fungus genus Willkommlangea (named in 1891, it also honours his collaborator Johan Lange).

== Written works ==
Willkomm's "Grundzüge der Pflanzenverbreitung auf der Iberischen Halbinsel" (Outline of plant distribution in the Iberian Peninsula) was included in Engler and Drude's "Die Vegetation der Erde". His major works include:

- Zwei Jahre in Spanien und Portugal (1847)
- Sertum floræ hispanicæ (1852)
- Wanderungen durch die nordöstlichen und centralen Provinzen Spaniens (1852)
- Die Strand- und Steppengebiete der iberischen Halbinsel und deren Vegetation (1852)
- Die Halbinsel der Pyrenäen (1855)
- Die Wunder des Mikroskops oder die Welt im kleinsten Raum (1856, several editions).
- Icones et descriptiones plantarum... Europæ austro-occidentalis, præcipue Hispaniæ (two volumes, 168 illustrations, (1852–56).
- Prodromus florae hispanicae (1861-1880, supplement 1893), with Johan Lange.
- Die mikroskopischen Feinde des Waldes (1866–67)
- Mikroskopets under eller en verld i det minsta; Stockholm : Em. Girons, 1871, with A M Selling.
- Forstliche Flora von Deutschland und Oesterreich (1875, new edition 1887).
- Spanien und die Balearen (1876)
- Deutschlands Laubhölzer im Winter (third edition, 1880)
- Illustrationes floræ Hispaniæ insularumque Balearium (1881–91).
