= Carlos Pau y Español =

Spanish botanist

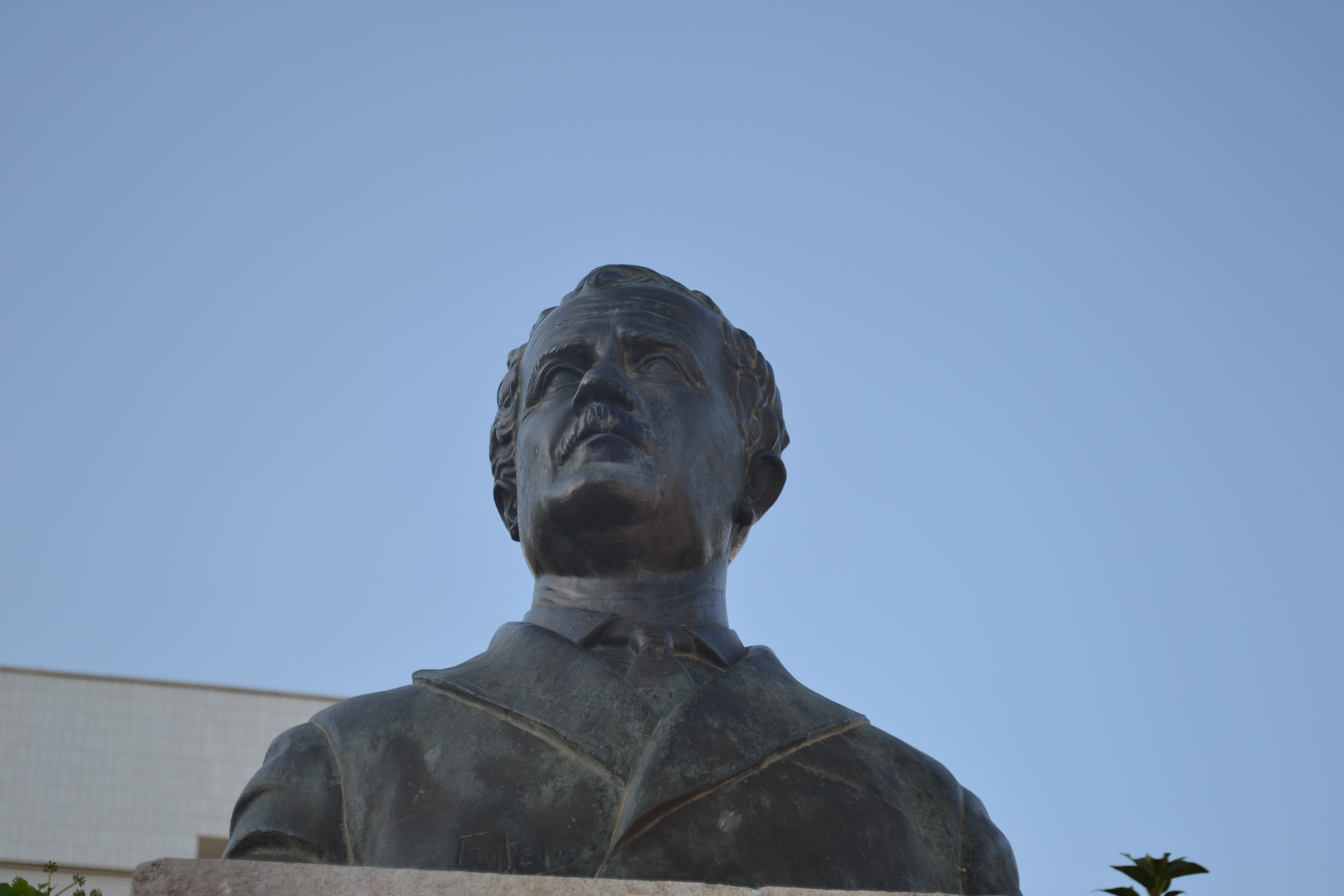
Bust in Segorbe.

Carlos Pau y Español (1857 in Segorbe, Spain – 1937 in Segorbe) was a Spanish botanist.
