= Alustante =

- Municipality
- Flag Coat of arms

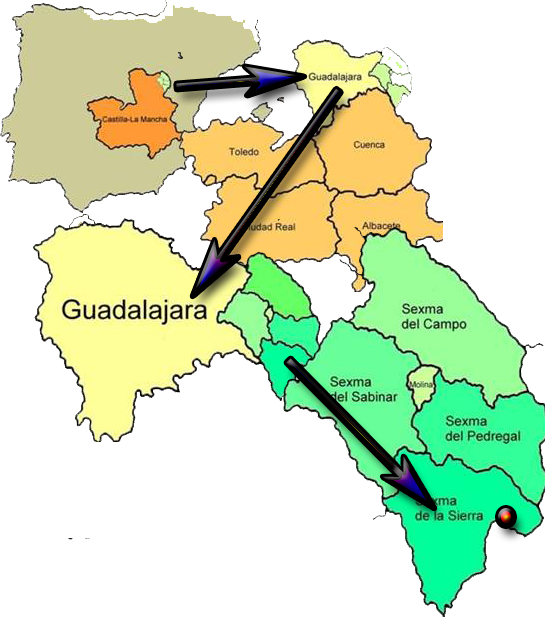

- Location in Spain Alustante (Castilla-La Mancha) Alustante (Spain)
- Coordinates: 40°36′59″N 01°39′27″W
- Country: Spain
- Autonomous community: Castile-La Mancha
- Province: Guadalajara
- Comarca: Señorío de Molina-Alto Tajo
- Judicial district: Molina de Aragón
- Commonwealth: Real Señorío de Molina y su Tierra and La Sierra

Government
  - Alcaldesa: Rosa Abel Muñoz Sánchez (2007) (PSOE)

Area
  - Total: 93.59 km^{2} (36.14 sq mi)
- Elevation: 1,410 m (4,630 ft)

Population (2025-01-01)
  - Total: 152
  - Density: 1.62/km^{2} (4.21/sq mi)
- Demonym: Alustantino-a
- Time zone: UTC+1 (CET)
  - Summer (DST): UTC+2 (CEST)
- Postal code: 19320
- Dialing code: 978
- Website: Official website

Alustante is a municipality located in the judicial region of Molina de Aragón, in the province of Guadalajara, Castile-La Mancha, Spain. According to the 2008 census (INE), the village has a population of 236 inhabitants. It is situated in the south-east of Guadalajara (province), 190 km from the capital city Guadalajara, 64 km from Teruel, 114 km from Cuenca, 195 km from Zaragoza and 210 km from Valencia.

Its altitude is 1404 meters above sea level, but its highest locations are the Peak of Valdefuentes (1747m), the Los Arrieros fountains (1787m) and the Neveras, also called the Banderín, (1787m). Historically Alustante has been integrated in the Sesma (group of municipalities) of La Serranía (mountain range) of the Royal Community of Molina de Aragón, which still holds assemblies twice a year, in Molina City.

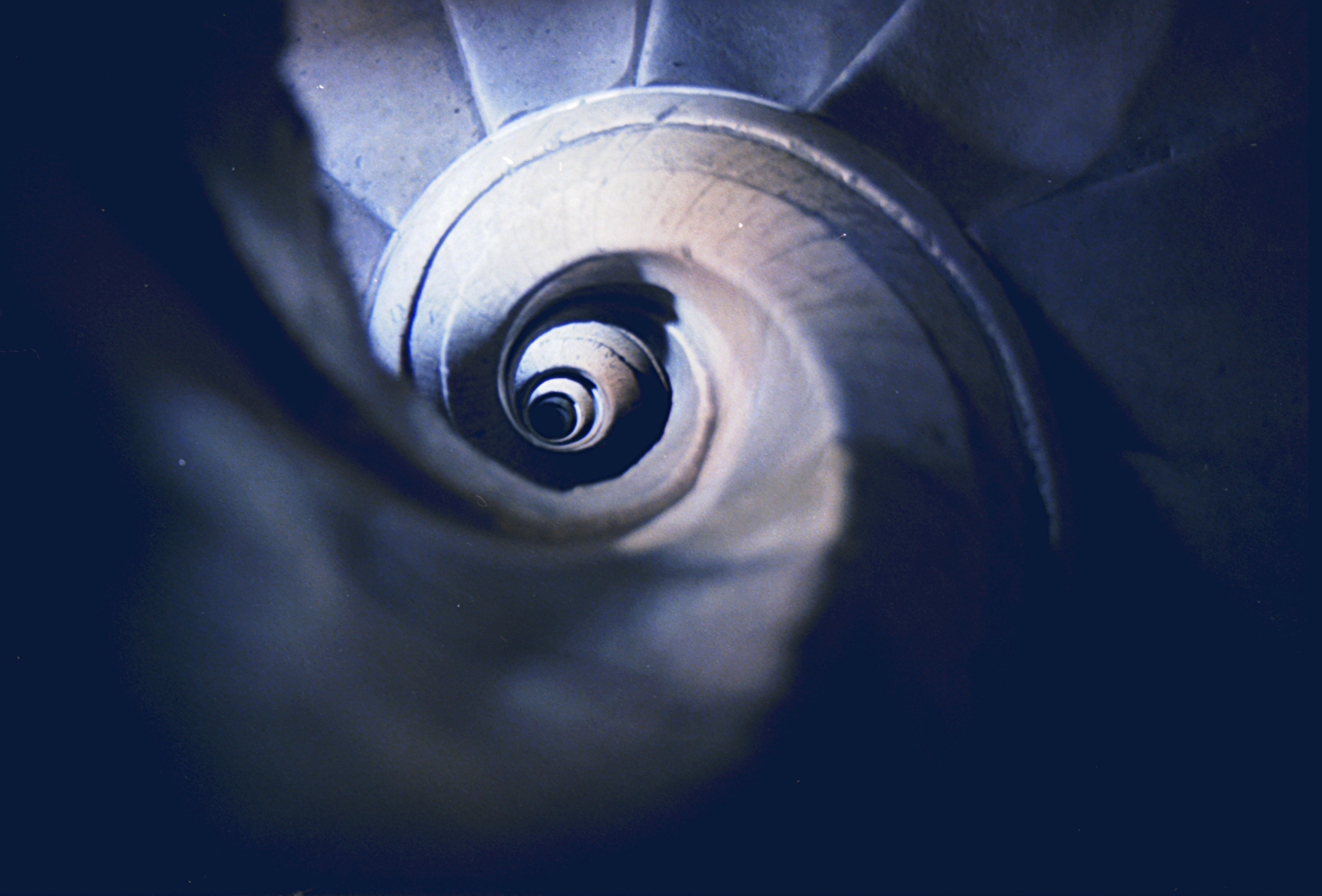
"Caracol" (stairs to the Tower) of the Church of Alustante

Alustante has also belonged to the Association of La Serranía since 1988.

Alustante's municipal district is about 62,21 km^{2}. It borders on Piqueras, Adobes and Tordesilos to the north, Ródenas and Motos to the east, Orihuela del Tremedal (province of Teruel, Aragón) and Orea to the south and Alcoroches to the west.

Since 1970, Alustante and Motos have formed a single district council, and their municipal area is 93,59 km^{2}. Each village has its own area for agriculture and cattle raising.

Alustante borders on the community of Aragón, which it depends on for essential services like health and education. Many of Alustante's students finish their schooling in Cella or Teruel.

Generally, the people of Alustante have strong social, economic and commercial ties with the province of Teruel. Even the telephone line comes from Albarracín, so Motos and Alustante are the only villages in the province of Guadalajara to have the telephone prefix of Teruel, 978, in their phone numbers. Guadalajara's prefix is 949.

Alustante also has strong ties with the city of Molina, where neighbours usually go shopping on Thursdays or to solve their administrative problems. Molina, then, is very important for the inhabitants of Alustante.

The village is situated in the north-east of the Albarracín Mountain Ranges in the Iberian Mountains, with a typical high mountain climate: cold and wet from September to June, with much snow in winter and dry and hot in summer.

Since the end of the 1990s, a great area of Alustante has formed part of the Natural Park of the Upper [Tajo]. The Park depends on the Assembly of the Autonomous Community of Castile-La Mancha.

As of 2008, Alustante had 236 inhabitants, but the population in winter fell to 160. Since the 1980s, people frequently return to Alustante at the weekend or for Christmas and Easter. Visits from people originally from Alustante who live in Valencia constitute an important influx to the population of the village. It is also frequent for people living in other cities like Zaragoza, Guadalajara, Barcelona or Madrid to spend weekends in Alustante. Many students in Guadalajara, Teruel or Molina de Aragón return to Alustante at the weekends to spend the weekend with their families.

The economy of Alustante is based on two important sectors: agriculture and timber, but Alustantinos who return to their village at the weekend and during holidays have created much work in the construction industry or public services.

There are currently four firms in Alustante devoted to rearing sheep, two building corporations, one stone factory, one building store, two timber factories, two food shops, one bar, one butcher's and three rural homes.
