= Bronchales =

Municipality in Aragon, Spain

- Municipality
- View of Bronchales from the hermitage of Santa Bárbara

- Coat of arms

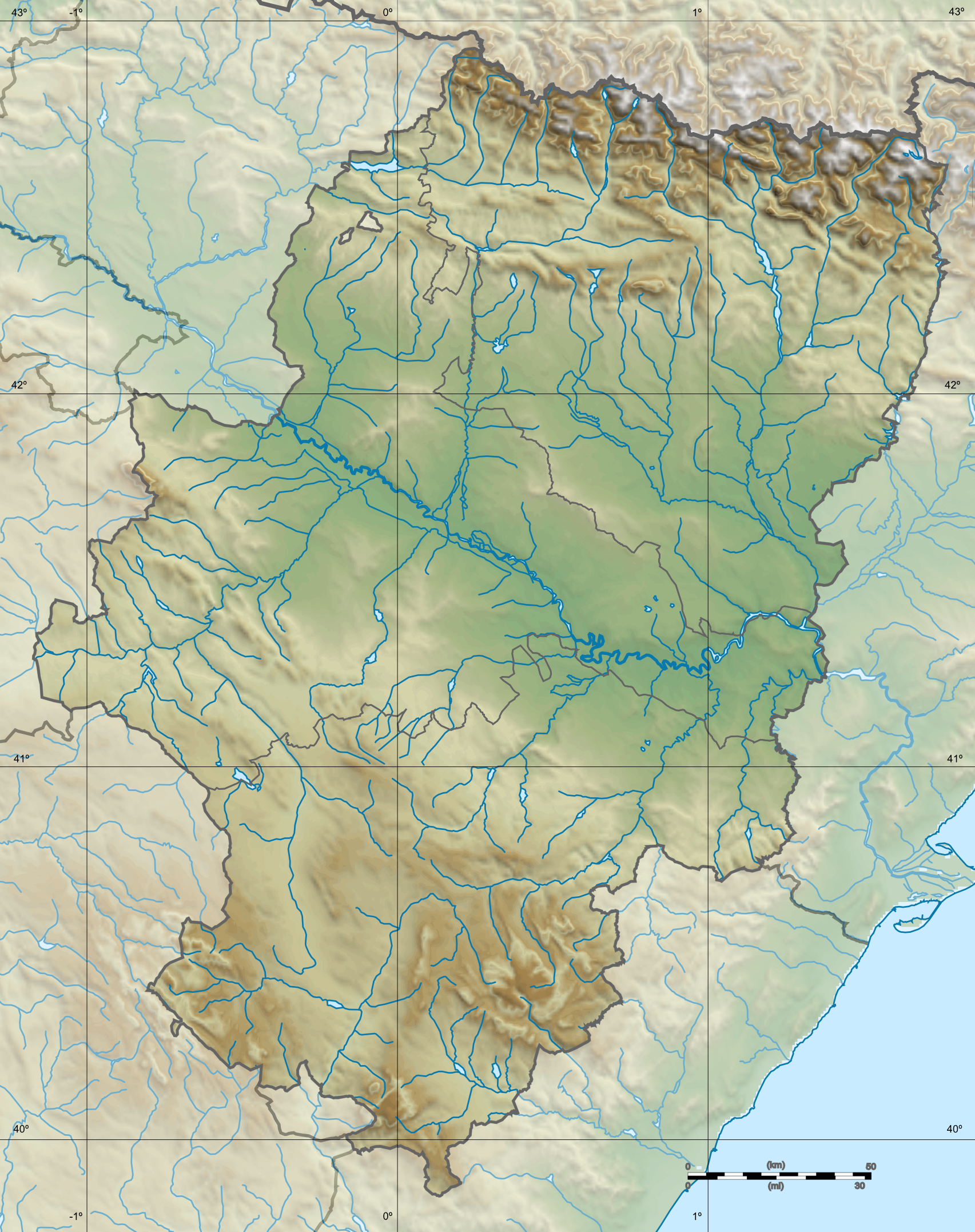
- Location in Aragon Bronchales (Spain)
- Coordinates: 40°30′32″N 1°35′19″W
- Country: Spain
- Autonomous community: Aragon
- Province: Teruel
- Comarca: Sierra de Albarracín

Government
  - Mayor: David Hernández Domingo (PP)

Area
  - Total: 59.60 km^{2} (23.01 sq mi)
- Elevation: 1,569 m (5,148 ft)

Population (2025-01-01)
  - Total: 465
  - Density: 7.80/km^{2} (20.2/sq mi)
- Time zone: UTC+1 (CET)
  - Summer (DST): UTC+2 (CEST)
- Postal code: 44367
- Website: www.bronchales.es

Bronchales is a village and municipality in the province of Teruel, Aragon, Spain, in the Sierra de Albarracín comarca. As of 1 January 2025 it had a population of 465.

Lying at an altitude of 1,569 metres (5,148 ft), Bronchales is one of the highest villages in Spain. It is known for its extensive Scots pine forests, considered among the best preserved in the Iberian Peninsula, which have made it a summer resort for families from Aragon and the neighbouring Valencian Community.

== Name ==
The village appears in the medieval epic Cantar de mio Cid under the older form Fronchales. In the route described in the poem, the Cid's men spend the night there on their way from Santa María de Albarracín to Medinaceli:

Por Santa María vos vayades passar … trocieron a Santa María e vinieron a albergar a Fronchales.

The origin and meaning of the name have not been firmly established.

== Geography ==
Scots pine forest near Bronchales

Bronchales lies in the southern part of the Iberian System, about 55 kilometres (34 mi) by road north-west of the provincial capital, Teruel. The municipal area covers 59.60 square kilometres (23.01 sq mi) and forms part of the mountain landscape of the Montes Universales and the Sierra de Albarracín. Because of its altitude, the climate is mountainous, with cold, often snowy winters and relatively mild summers.

The landscape is dominated by extensive stands of Scots pine (Pinus sylvestris), which are among the municipality's main natural and tourist assets. Wildlife includes red deer, roe deer and wild boar, as well as several species of birds of prey. The area is also known for its wild mushrooms, which attract many visitors in autumn.

There are numerous natural springs in the municipality, the best known being the Fuente del Canto, Fuente de la Doncella, Fuente del Chorro and Fuente de los Aguanosos. They were traditionally important for the water supply and local agriculture.

== History ==
=== Prehistory and antiquity ===
Flint tools attributed to the Neolithic have been found in the municipality, at sites such as Las Tejedas and the Fuente del Hierro. A Celtiberian necropolis of the 5th century BC discovered at Bronchales has provided evidence of settlement in the area and of transhumance routes linking the Montes Universales with the upper Guadalquivir.

From the Roman period come finds at El Endrinal, including fragments of moulds for producing terra sigillata pottery. The availability of suitable clay, water and fuel probably favoured local ceramic production.

=== Middle Ages ===
Under Muslim rule the area lay on the border between the taifas of Albarracín and Zaragoza. A silver dirham of the Zaragozan ruler Ahmad al-Muqtadir, dated AH 440 and found at the former castle of Santa Bárbara, points to links with the Taifa of Zaragoza.

Around 1170 the territory of Albarracín came under the rule of the Navarrese nobleman Pedro Ruiz de Azagra. Bronchales became part of the Lordship of Albarracín and was later incorporated into the Crown of Aragon. By a privilege granted at Teruel on 21 June 1257 by King James I of Aragon, Bronchales was assigned to the Community of Santa María de Albarracín. It gave its name to the historical administrative district of the Sesma de Bronchales, which comprised Bronchales, Orihuela del Tremedal, Ródenas, Pozondón and Monterde de Albarracín.

=== Early modern and modern period ===
The present parish church was completed between 1624 and 1689. In the mid-19th century, Pascual Madoz's gazetteer recorded 115 houses and 356 inhabitants, an economy based on cereals, sheep and goats, and charcoal-making as the villagers' main trade. The village's historical documentation is preserved partly in the municipal and parish archives, and documents from the 14th to the 19th century have been studied by the Centro de Estudios de la Comunidad de Albarracín.

=== Spanish Civil War ===
During the Spanish Civil War the Sierra de Albarracín was affected by the military operations of the Battle of Teruel, and troops and military installations were temporarily stationed in Bronchales. A 2024 study by Dimas Vaquero Peláez and Blas Vicente Marco documents the presence in the village of German personnel of the Condor Legion, sent by Nazi Germany in support of the Nationalist side. During the Republican offensive of December 1937, several of these servicemen were surprised and captured by Republican units together with military equipment. The village was occupied by the Republican People's Army in January 1938 and retaken by Francoist troops the following month. A complementary publication by Manuel Herranz brings together period photographs from private and local collections showing German soldiers, vehicles and artillery in Bronchales.

=== Repression and deportation ===
In the general election of February 1936 the Popular Front list had won in Bronchales. After the Nationalist occupation of the Sierra de Albarracín in the summer of 1937, the Provincial Commission for the Seizure of Property of Teruel listed 58 residents of Bronchales, the second-highest number in the sierra after Terriente; 55 of them, all from Bronchales, were prosecuted for "usurpation of property". Many had fled with their families for fear of arrest. The repression continued after the war: the Con Nombre y Apellidos database of the Association for the Recovery of Historical Memory of Aragon (ARMHA) lists more than a hundred victims of the war and the repression born in Bronchales, at least ten of them women, and records cases of internment in Francoist concentration camps such as the one at Burriana.

Some residents who had crossed into France at the end of the war ended up in Nazi concentration camps. According to research by Raúl Ibáñez Hervás, three of the twelve people from the Sierra de Albarracín who passed through these camps came from Bronchales; nine of the twelve died there. After internment in French refugee camps and, following the German occupation, in prisoner-of-war camps (Stalags), they were treated as stateless because the Franco regime disowned them, and were made to wear the blue triangle with the letter "S" assigned to Spaniards. Ibáñez notes that their stories were almost unknown in their home villages, in some cases even within their own families. The database of the Amical de Mauthausen also records a native of Bronchales, born in 1916, who was deported in May 1944 from Compiègne to Neuengamme and its subcamps at Bremen and Watenstedt, and who was liberated in 1945.

=== Late 20th century ===
The mechanisation of agriculture, the abandonment of smallholdings and the resulting loss of jobs led to marked rural flight in the second half of the 20th century, while the village became established as a summer destination, particularly for families from Aragon and the Valencian Community.

== Demographics ==
Historical population
| Year | Pop. | ±% |
|---|---|---|
| 1846 | 356 | — |
| 1981 | 438 | +23.0% |
| 1991 | 475 | +8.4% |
| 2001 | 472 | −0.6% |
| 2011 | 465 | −1.5% |
| 2021 | 432 | −7.1% |
| 2025 | 465 | +7.6% |
Source: Madoz (1846); INE.

Bronchales is one of the most populous municipalities of the Sierra de Albarracín, a comarca with one of the lowest population densities in Europe; only Albarracín and neighbouring Orihuela del Tremedal have more inhabitants.

== Government ==
Mayors since the first democratic municipal elections:

| Term | Mayor | Party |
|---|---|---|
| 1979–1983 | José García Lahoz | CD |
| 1983–1987 | Ricardo Sáez Soriano | – |
| 1987–1991 | Ricardo Cavero Giménez | – |
| 1991–2003 | Maximiano Pérez López | – |
| 2003–2007 | Juan Pedro Pérez Dobón | – |
| 2007–2011 | Baldomero Pérez Fuertes | – |
| 2011–2015 | Francisco Nácher Dobón | CHA |
| 2015–2019 | Jorge Hernández Perona | PSOE |
| 2019–2023 | José Luis Agustén Gil | CHA |
| 2023– | David Hernández Domingo | PP |

== Economy ==
The traditional economy rested on cereal farming, forestry and sheep and cattle raising. Today tourism, food processing and mineral water bottling are also important; mineral water has been bottled industrially in the village since 2003. A small industrial estate also hosts ham drying and curing facilities.

=== Tourism ===
Bronchales is a base for hiking, mountain biking and other outdoor activities in the forests of the Sierra de Albarracín, as well as for nature watching and mushroom foraging. The Las Corralizas campsite lies in a wooded high-mountain area near the village. Tourism is concentrated in the summer months, when many holidaymakers and seasonal residents from Aragon and the Valencian Community arrive.

== Landmarks ==
Traditional house in Bronchales

- Church of Our Lady of the Assumption (Iglesia de Nuestra Señora de la Asunción): the parish church has a single nave of three bays with Gothic star vaults, side chapels and a polygonal apse. Its interior was built mainly between 1624 and 1689; it also has a square two-stage bell tower and a neoclassical portal.
- Hermitage of Santa Bárbara: stands on a hill at the edge of the village, on the site of the former castle; the grounds are now partly used as a cemetery. It offers wide views over the village and the surrounding mountains.
- Traditional architecture: the old centre preserves examples of vernacular mountain architecture, with stone façades, wrought-iron grilles and roofs adapted to the winter climate.

== Festivals ==
The patronal festivities are held in mid-August in honour of Our Lady of the Assumption and Saint Roch, usually over several days between 14 and 19 August. Their highlight is the Sopeta de San Roque on 16 August, when large quantities of wine are handed out and participants dance to music while splashing each other with wine.

== Solar eclipse of 2026 ==
The total solar eclipse of 12 August 2026 seen from Bronchales

On 12 August 2026 Bronchales lay within the path of totality of the total solar eclipse, which crossed much of the province of Teruel. In view of the expected influx of visitors and the increased risk of forest fires and traffic problems, the Government of Aragon adopted special prevention and emergency measures for 10–13 August.

== Notable people ==
- Clemente Pamplona Blasco (1918–2001), journalist, screenwriter and film director

== See also ==
- List of municipalities in Teruel
