= Pedro Villacampa =

Spanish army officer (1776–1854)

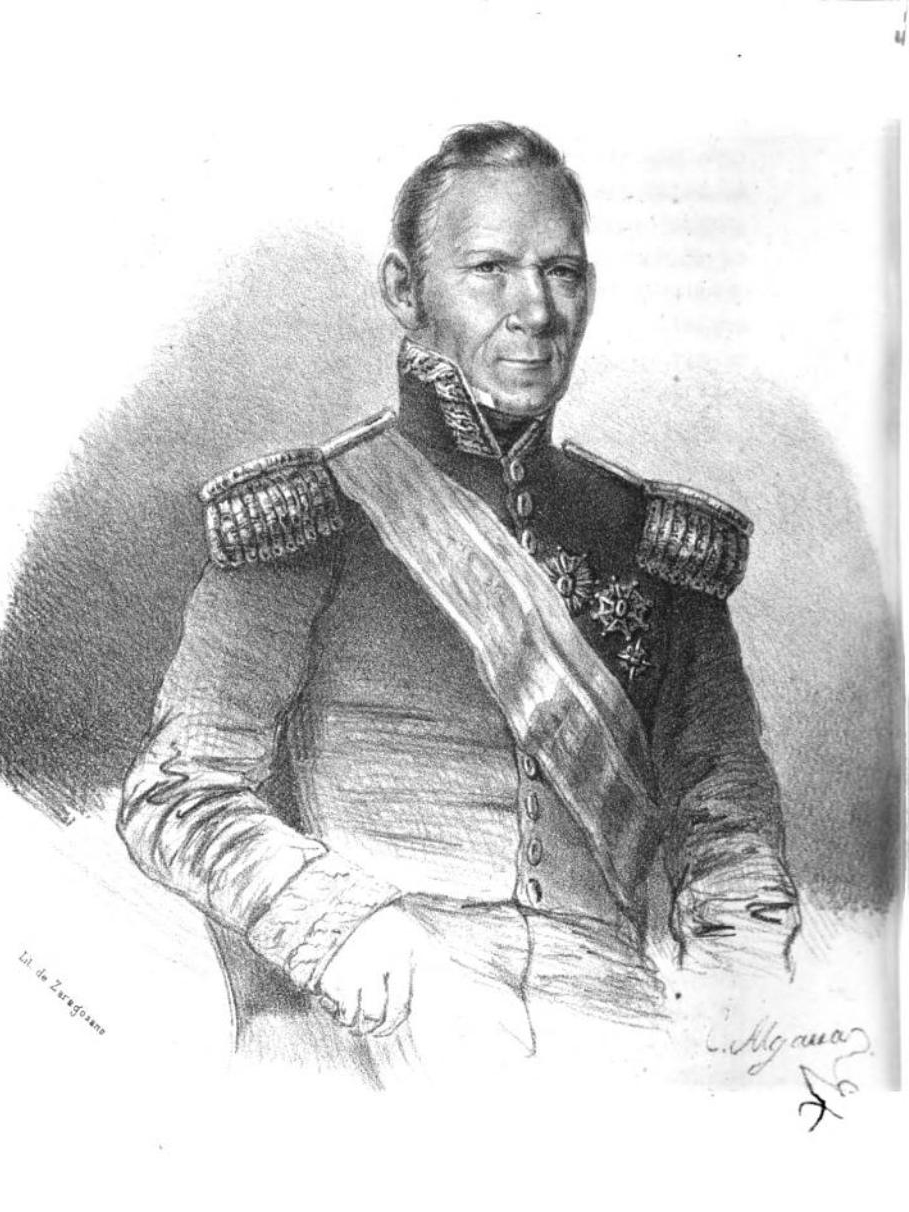
- Portrait, c. 1847
- Born: 10 May 1776; Laguarta, Huesca, Aragón
- Died: 27 December 1854 (aged 78) Madrid
- Conflicts: War of the Pyrenees; War of the Oranges; Peninsular War

Pedro Villacampa Maza de Linaza y Periel (1776–1854) was a Spanish military commander in the Napoleonic Wars and related conflicts.

== Early career ==
In 1793 he enlisted in the 2nd Battalion of the Volunteers of Aragón, becoming a cadet the following year, and promoted to second lieutenant in 1795, seeing action during the War of the Pyrenees.

After the war, he was detailed to apprehend smugglers and bandits in the Campo de Gibraltar and Old Castile. At the end of 1800, he was promoted to captain for having captured a notorious bandolero.

He saw action during the War of the Oranges, and then joined the garrison at Zaragoza and later those of Barcelona and Denia.

In 1805 he was transferred to the Balearic Islands where, when news reached him of the May Uprising, he made arrangements to return to the mainland.

== Peninsular War ==
=== 1808 ===
He transferred to the 2nd Battalion of Volunteers of Aragón, which was defending Zaragoza. At the end of that year he was given command of the 1st Battalion of Volunteers of Huesca.

=== 1809 ===
Serving under Brigadier Renovales at Zaragoza, Villacampa was sent to defend the Convent of San José and for which he was promoted to lieutenant colonel. He was later sent to defend other strategic places, such as the convent of Santa Mónica and after repelling several attacks, he was promoted to brigadier.

In February 1809, he was injured and taken prisoner by Marshal Lannes's troops, but was able to escape before being sent to France.

At the beginning of March, Villacampa joined General Blake's army, was promoted to field marshal and sent out to the region of Lower Aragon to raise a division. Throughout that summer Villacampa recruited a large force and established his headquarters at the Sanctuary of Our Lady of Fuensanta (Orihuela del Tremedal), where he was later defeated by a much larger force led by Henriod, although Villacampa was able to retreat with many of his troops.

Following the capitulation of Zaragoza the previous February, and Suchet's defeat of Blake's troops at Belchite in June, the French commander could only count on control of the towns of Zaragoza and Jaca since the rest of Aragón, apart from plain of the Ebro, which forms the central area of Aragon, was mountainous terrain suited to guerrilla warfare, of which there was more than one focus of resistance. On the hand, in the mountains to the north-west, Brigadier Renovales, who had been one of the commanding officers at Zaragoza and, although taken prisoner, had managed to escape, now headed a guerrilla band in the Roncal Valley and along the borders of Navarre. To the north-east, in the hills beyond Jaca, the local chiefs Perena and Sarasa were active. And south of the Ebro, Colonel Gayán (Note: Gayán's band was formed around the disciplined regulars of La Princesa Regiment, part of General La Romana's Division of the North's that had crossed northern Spain after the defeat of Blake's Army of Galicia at Santander. (Oman, 1908: p. 11.)) and Villacampa, both officers of Blake's regular army, were active around the mountain towns of Daroca and Molina, in the Sierra de Albarracín.

=== 1810 ===
In 1810, Villacampa's division was active in the area around Teruel, seeing action at Villel (10 February), Teruel (3 March) and Albentosa (11 March). That same month, he was able to blockade the French garrison at Teruel, cutting off two columns, and capturing four guns and some 300 prisoners.

They then moved into the area of Calatayud, where they fought at El Frasno (13 May) The following day, his troops half destroyed a column of 350 men at Arandija, on the banks of the Xalon, before returning to the area of Teruel in September. On 16 July 1810, his troops fought at the action of Cariñena.

The combined partisan forces he led in Aragón, together with General Carvajal saw action as far up as Andorra (6 September 1810). The following month their combined forces were beaten back by General Chłopicki's forces at the combat at Alventosa (31 October) and then at Fuensanta (11 November 1810).

At the end of 1810, with Blake sent to defend Valencia, the forces of General Villacampa and Juan Martín el Empecinado came under the command of the captain general of Valencia, Bassecourt, with Villacampa later joining Carlos O'Donnell's 2nd Army.

=== 1811 ===
On 11 January 1811, at Checa, in the province of Guadalajara, his division of 6,000 troops and 600 horse was defeated by a French force of exactly half that number.

On 23 March 1811, his troops fought alongside el Empecinado's men at Auñón (Guadalajara).

=== 1812 ===
With the fall of Valencia (January 1812), Villacampa returned to the region of Aragón and was especially active the following March, beating French forces at Campillo (15th), Ateca (25th), Pozodon (28th) and Monteverde, in the Sierra de Albarracín. On 2 October 1812, he recaptured the town of Calatayud, and on December, he saw action at La Almunia.

Villacampa's actions at Dumeño and Chelva, aimed at closing off Soult's retreat into Valencia, resulted in him becoming the first recipient of the Laureate Cross of Saint Ferdinand, Spain's highest military decoration.

=== 1813 ===
In 1813 Villacampa was appointed military governor of Madrid and captain general of New Castile.

== Post-war career ==
At around the time of Fernando VII's return to Spain (March 1814), Villacampa was promoted to lieutenant general. Given the political tension following the publication of Manifiesto de los Persas, he put the troops in a state of alert.

Dismissed from his post in Madrid, Villacampa retired to Zaragoza where, in April 1815, he confessed to the charges of having defended the Constitution against Fernando VII's absolutist regimen. His plea of clemency was ignored by the king and he was sentenced to eight year's imprisonment at Montjuic, as well as being stripped of all his military roles and honours. Four years into his sentence, new accusations appeared against him, but coinciding with the Trienio Liberal and the restoration of the Constitution in 1820, he was released, and appointed captain general of Catalonia. In February 1822, he was appointed captain general of Granada, and in April 1823, captain general of Andalusia and political governor of Sevilla the following month.

At the onset of the Ominous Decade, Villacampa had to leave Spain for Marseille, and then on to Malta and Tunisia. Following the death of King Ferdinand in 1833 and Spain's transition from an absolute monarchy to a constitutional monarchy, and the subsequent amnesty that Maria Christina offered the exiled liberals, Villacampa returned to Spain and his rank and military honours were restored.

Villacampa was then appointed interim political and military commander-in-chief of Minorca until 1838, when he was appointed captain general of the Balearic Islands.

Following his appointment as senator for Huesca in 1843, he returned to Zaragoza in 1844. In 1845, he was appointed senator for life.
