= Sierra de Albarracín Comarca =

Coordinates: 40°23′N 1°34′W

Sierra de Albarracín Comarca Comarca de la Sierra de Albarracín
- Comarca
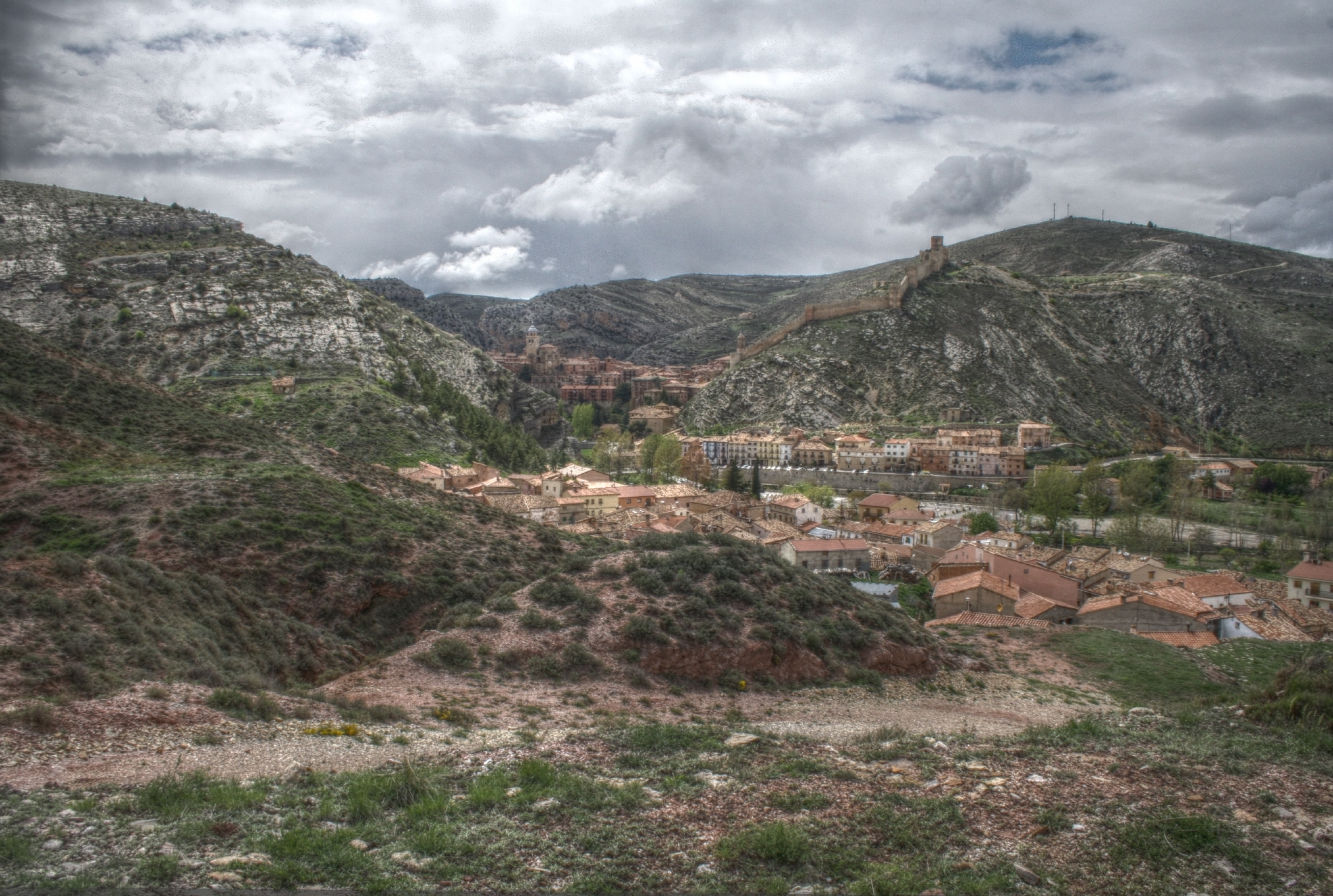
- View of Albarracín

- Country: Spain
- Autonomous community: Aragon
- Province: Teruel
- Capital: Albarracín
- Municipalities: List: See text

Area
  - Total: 1,414 km^{2} (546 sq mi)

Population
  - Total: 4,961
  - Density: 3.508/km^{2} (9.087/sq mi)
- Time zone: UTC+1 (CET)
  - Summer (DST): UTC+2 (CEST)
- Largest municipality: Albarracín

Sierra de Albarracín Comarca is a comarca in the Province of Teruel, Aragon region, northeastern Spain. It is located in mountain ranges of the Sistema Ibérico (Iberian System).

== Geography ==
The Comarca de la Sierra de Albarracín is in an area formerly known locally as Tierra de Albarracín, roughly corresponding to the ancient Señorío de Albarracín feudal manor. Its capital is Albarracín, a town surrounded by stony hills that was declared Monumento Nacional in 1961.

This mountainous comarca is named after the Sierra de Albarracín, the main mountain range in this area of the Sistema Ibérico (Iberian System) of mountain ranges. The comarca includes other mountain ranges of the Sistema Ibérico also, foremost of which are the Montes Universales.

=== Municipalities ===
Albarracín, Bezas, Bronchales, Calomarde, Frías de Albarracín, Gea de Albarracín, Griegos, Guadalaviar, Jabaloyas, Monterde de Albarracín, Moscardón, Noguera de Albarracín, Orihuela del Tremedal, Pozondón, Ródenas, Royuela, Rubiales, Saldón, Terriente, Toril y Masegoso, Torres de Albarracín, Tramacastilla, Valdecuenca, El Vallecillo and Villar del Cobo.

== See also ==
- Albarracín
- Comarcas of Aragon
- Geography of the Province of Teruel
- Sistema Ibérico topics
