= Ramón Gayán =

Spanish army officer (1772–1846)

- Born: 30 August 1772; Paniza, Zaragoza
- Died: 1846 Paniza
- Conflicts: Peninsular War

Ramón Gayán y Díaz (1772–1846) was a Spanish military commander.

== Peninsular War ==
=== 1808 ===
Gayán's name first appears on 5 June 1808, as a captain. The following August he was promoted to lieutenant colonel, in command of the Company of Campo de Cariñena Rifles.

=== 1809 ===
Following the capitulation of Zaragoza the previous February, and Suchet's defeat of Blake's troops at Belchite in June, the French commander could only count on control of the towns of Zaragoza and Jaca since the rest of Aragón, apart from plain of the Ebro, which forms the central area of Aragon, was mountainous terrain suited to guerrilla warfare, of which there was more than one focus of resistance. On the hand, in the mountains to the north-west, Brigadier Renovales, who had been one of the commanding officers at Zaragoza and, although taken prisoner, had managed to escape, now headed a guerrilla band in the Roncal Valley and along the borders of Navarre. To the north-east, in the hills beyond Jaca, the local chiefs Perena and Sarasa were active. And south of the Ebro, Villacampa and Gayán, both officers of Blake's regular army, were active around the mountain towns of Daroca and Molina, in the Sierra de Albarracín.

In 1809, Gayán had been tasked with raising a band of guerrilleros in the region of Calatayud, and soon had around a thousand men, Battalion of Campo de Cariñena Rifles, a force with which he had been able to cut the French communication lines between Zaragoza and Madrid.

Gayán's band was formed around the disciplined regulars of La Princesa Regiment, part of General La Romana's Division of the North that had crossed northern Spain after the defeat of Blake's Army of Galicia at Santander.

In July Suchet's troops stormed Gayán's mountain stronghold at the sanctuary of Nuestra Señora del Aguila, driving the guerrillas further up into the mountains.

By the end of the year, Gayán was leading a force that had grown to three thousand men.

=== 1810 ===
Gayán was promoted to colonel in January 1810 (with effective date of promotion August 1811).

=== 1811 ===
His troops were incorporated into José Obispo's 4th Division (known as the Aragonese Division) of the Army of Aragón and Catalonia, seeing action at Jérica (Castellón) on 21 October 1811.

At the end of the following December, he transferred his troops to General Mahy's army at Alicante.

=== 1812 ===
Gayán then brought together several of the loose bands of guerrilleros in the region to form the Regiment of Chasseurs of Campo de Cariñena, with which he moved around the area of Daroca during February and early March, finally attacking and taking the town on 12 March 1812. The following week (17 March) he defeated a French column at nearby Villafeliche.

He then moved on to Calamocha, attacked Calatayud (29 April) and, although he was unable to take the castle itself, he captured the governor, Fabalelli, and 60 men. He was unable to storm the fortified convent of Nuestra Señora de la Peña, in which the rest of the Italian garrison had taken refuge but besieged them until a column under brigadiers Saint-Paul and Schiazzetti, sent by Palombini to relieve the town, managed to drive away Gayán's men on 9 May.

On 24 June, he took Teruel.

By December 1812 the guerrilla bands in Aragón were superior in number to the French troops.

=== 1813 ===
On 13 April, at the head of three companies, he attacked a French column at Borja.

On 19 May, he defeated a column of 2,000 troops and 100 horse sent out from Zaragoza by General Paris, forcing them to retreat back to the city.

On 5 or 11 June, Gayán took Caspe, with 1,500 enemy troops dead or wounded and taking 500 prisoners. On the 18th, he overpowered the garrison at Alcañiz, leaving 200 dead and taking 134 prisoners. On 11 July, together with Generals Espoz, and Durán, his troops liberated Zaragoza. He was appointed lieutenant-governor of Zaragoza the following September.

At the beginning of December 1813, his men took Jaca.

== Post-war career ==
Gayán was appointed governor of Cardona (Barcelona) on 6 November 1819, retiring in March 1823 to his birthplace, Paniza.

In 1836 he was appointed political and military governor of Calatayud, finally retiring from the army in December 1841.

He died in 1846 from the wounds resulting from a hunting accident.
