= Metopoceras =

Scientific classification
- Domain: Eukaryota
- Kingdom: Animalia
- Phylum: Arthropoda
- Class: Insecta
- Order: Lepidoptera
- Superfamily: Noctuoidea
- Family: Noctuidae
- Subfamily: Acontiinae
- Genus: Metopoceras; Guenee, 1850

Genus of moths

Metopoceras is a genus of moths of the family Noctuidae.

== Species ==
- Metopoceras albarracina Hampson, 1918
- Metopoceras canroberti Oberthür, 1918
- Metopoceras delicata (Staudinger, 1898)
- Metopoceras driss Rungs, 1952
- Metopoceras duseutrei (Oberthür, 1922)
- Metopoceras felicina (Donzel, 1844)
- Metopoceras khalildja Oberthür, 1884
- Metopoceras kneuckeri (Rebel, 1903)
- Metopoceras philbyi Wiltshire, 1980
- Metopoceras omar (Oberthür, 1887)
- Metopoceras solituda (Brandt, 1938)
