= Metopoceras canroberti =

Scientific classification
- Domain: Eukaryota
- Kingdom: Animalia
- Phylum: Arthropoda
- Class: Insecta
- Order: Lepidoptera
- Superfamily: Noctuoidea
- Family: Noctuidae
- Genus: Metopoceras
- Species: M. canroberti

Binomial name
- Metopoceras canroberti Oberthür, 1918

Synonyms
- Erythrophaia canroberti; Metopoceras codeti Hampson, 1906

Species of moth

Metopoceras canroberti is a moth of the family Noctuidae. It is found in Morocco, Yemen, Algeria and eastern Africa.

The wingspan is about 26 mm.
