= Metopoceras khalildja =

Scientific classification
- Domain: Eukaryota
- Kingdom: Animalia
- Phylum: Arthropoda
- Class: Insecta
- Order: Lepidoptera
- Superfamily: Noctuoidea
- Family: Noctuidae
- Genus: Metopoceras
- Species: M. khalildja

Binomial name
- Metopoceras khalildja Oberthür, 1884

Synonyms
- Metopoceras chalildja Hampson, 1906; Metopoceras gypsata Turati, 1922; Metopoceras sagarraina (Peres, deGregorio, Romana & Ferrer-Vidal, 1980)

Species of moth

Metopoceras khalildja is a moth of the family Noctuidae. It is found in Morocco, Spain, Sicily, Algeria, Tunisia, Libya and Egypt

The wingspan is about 29 mm. Adults are on wing in March.

== Subspecies ==
- Metopoceras khalildja khalildja
- Metopoceras khalildja suenderi (Formentera, Balearic Islands)
