= Metopoceras duseutrei =

Scientific classification
- Domain: Eukaryota
- Kingdom: Animalia
- Phylum: Arthropoda
- Class: Insecta
- Order: Lepidoptera
- Superfamily: Noctuoidea
- Family: Noctuidae
- Genus: Metopoceras
- Species: M. duseutrei

Binomial name
- Metopoceras duseutrei (Oberthür, 1922)

Synonyms
- Metopocera duseutrei Oberthür, 1922; Ammetopa agnellus Zerny, 1935

Species of moth

Metopoceras duseutrei is a moth of the family Noctuidae. It is found in Morocco, Algeria and Mauritania.

Adults are on wing from March to April.
