= Frías de Albarracín =

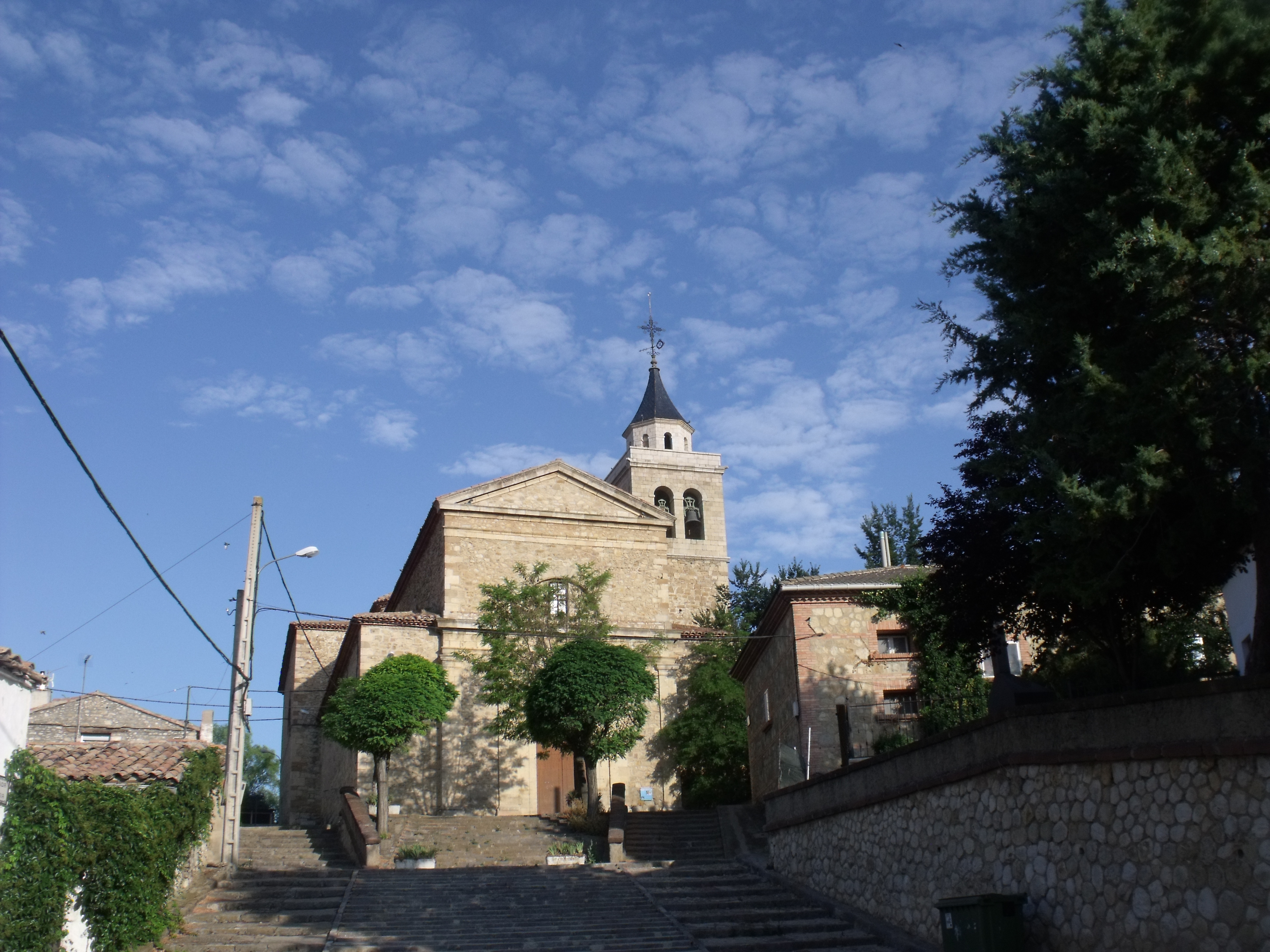

- Location within Spain
- Coordinates: 40°20′N 1°37′W
- Country: Spain
- Autonomous community: Aragon
- Province: Teruel
- Comarca: Sierra de Albarracín Comarca
- Municipality: Frías de Albarracín

Area
  - Total: 50.79 km^{2} (19.61 sq mi)
- Elevation: 1,496 m (4,908 ft)

Population (2025-01-01)
  - Total: 109
  - Density: 2.15/km^{2} (5.56/sq mi)
- Time zone: UTC+1 (CET)
  - Summer (DST): UTC+2 (CEST)
- Postal code: 44126

Frías de Albarracín is a municipality in the province of Teruel, Sierra de Albarracín Comarca, Aragon, Spain. The town is located in the Montes Universales area, Sistema Ibérico. According to the 2013 census (INE), the municipality has a population of 143 inhabitants.

The source of the Tagus is the Fuente de García, located within the Frías de Albarracín municipal term at almost 1,600 m (5,200 ft) above sea level.

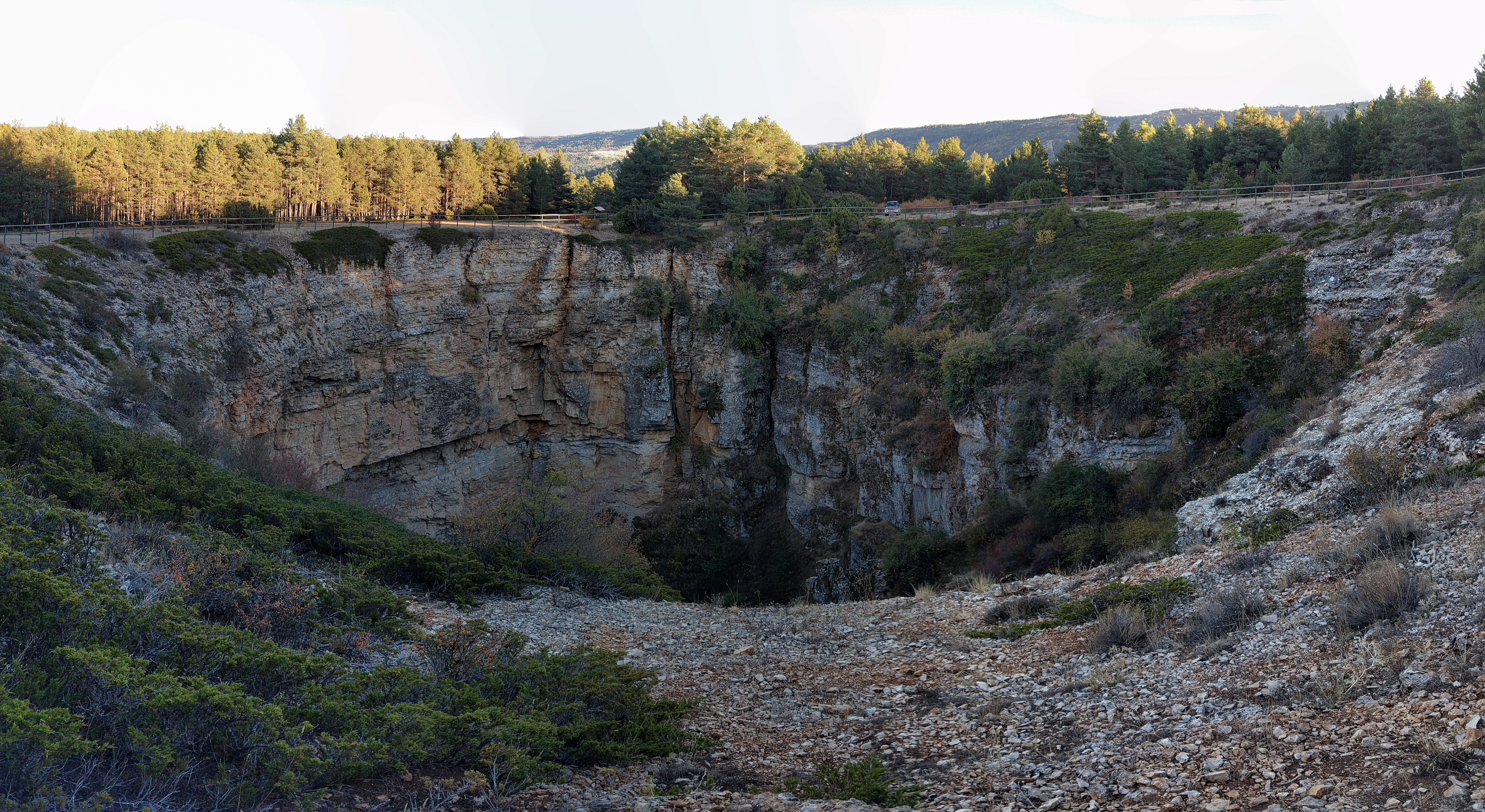
The chasm at Frías

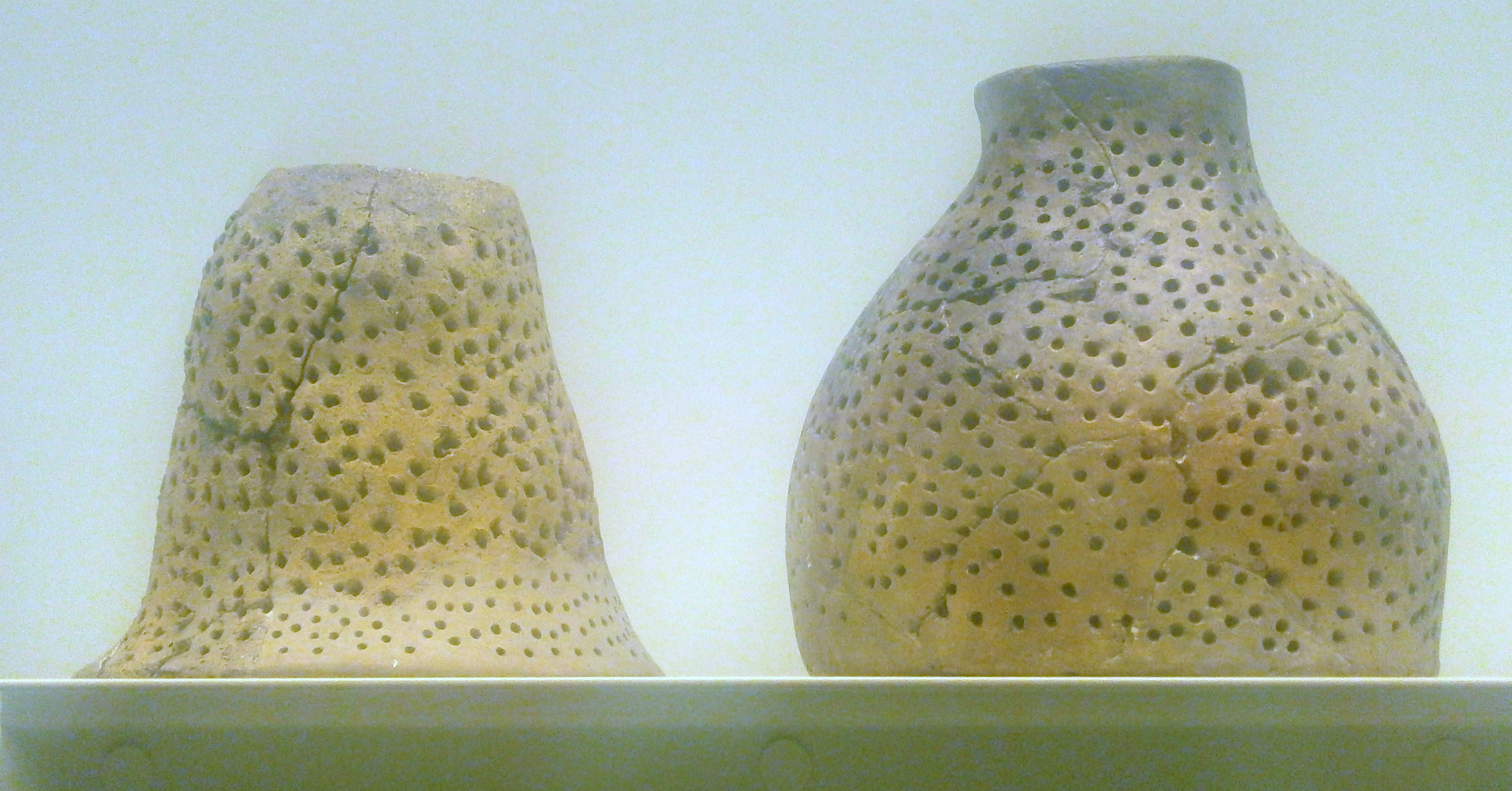
Queseras, containers for storing and preserving cheese, found at Frías castle.

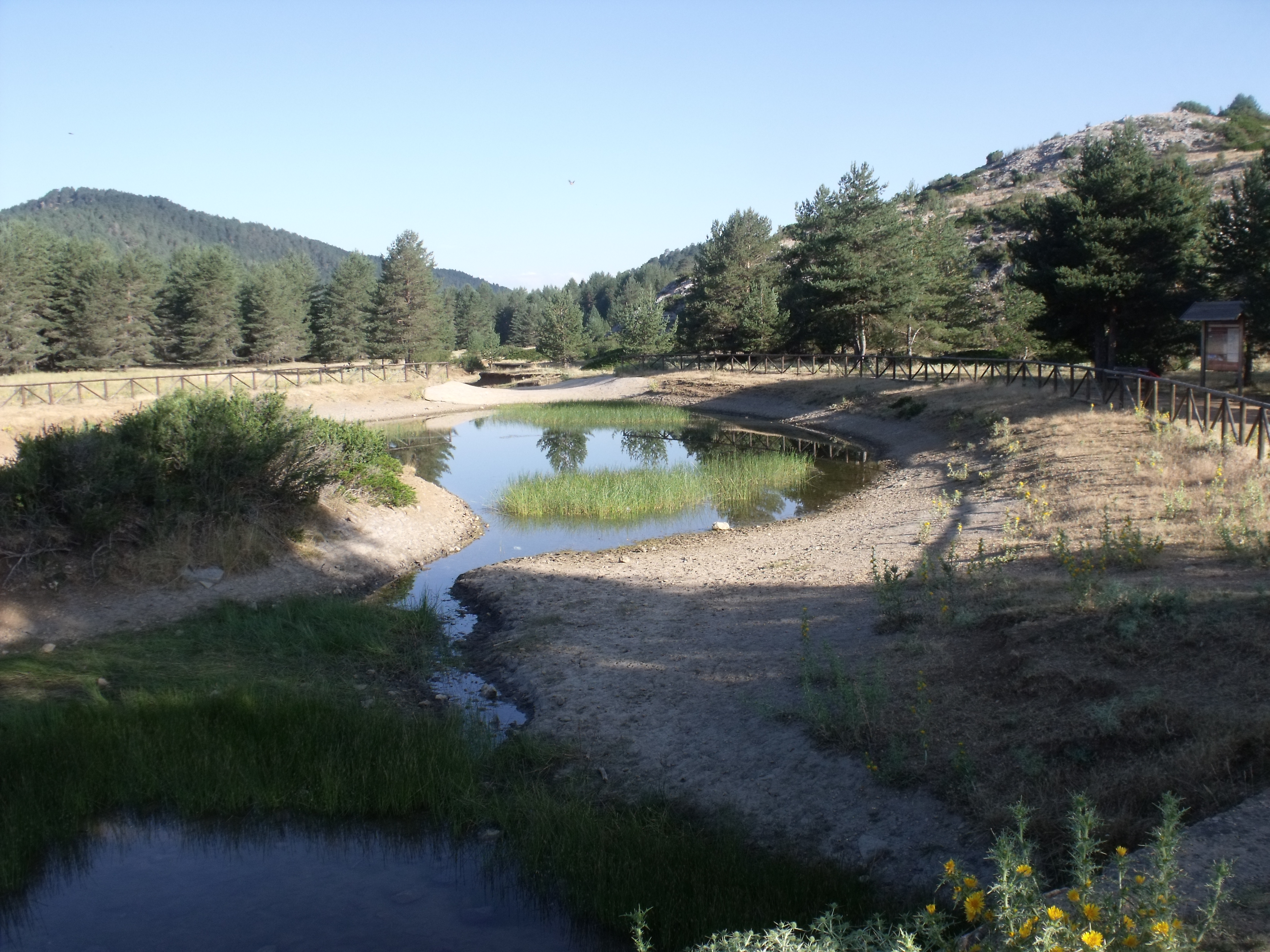
Tagus River source

== See also ==
- Montes Universales
- List of municipalities in Teruel
