= Metopoceras solituda =

Scientific classification
- Kingdom: Animalia
- Phylum: Arthropoda
- Class: Insecta
- Order: Lepidoptera
- Superfamily: Noctuoidea
- Family: Noctuidae
- Genus: Metopoceras
- Species: M. solituda

Binomial name
- Metopoceras solituda (Brandt, 1938)

Species of moth

Metopoceras solituda is a moth of the family Noctuidae first described by Brandt in 1938. It is found in the eremic (desert) parts of Africa, north to south-western Iran and the Near East, where it occurs in Saudi Arabia, the Sinai in Egypt, Israel, Jordan, Lebanon and Syria.

Adults are on wing from March to April. There is one generation per year.

== Subspecies ==
- Metopoceras solituda solituda
- Metopoceras solituda eutychina (Israel, ...)
