= Metopoceras omar =

Scientific classification
- Domain: Eukaryota
- Kingdom: Animalia
- Phylum: Arthropoda
- Class: Insecta
- Order: Lepidoptera
- Superfamily: Noctuoidea
- Family: Noctuidae
- Genus: Metopoceras
- Species: M. omar

Binomial name
- Metopoceras omar (Oberthür, 1887)

Synonyms
- Cleophana omar Oberthür, 1887

Species of moth

Metopoceras omar is a moth of the family Noctuidae first described by Charles Oberthür in 1887. It is widespread through the Palearctic eremic (desert) zone from north-western Africa to the Near East and Middle East.

Adults are on wing from January to April. There is one generation per year.

== Subspecies ==
- Metopoceras omar omar
- Metopoceras omar felix (Cyprus, Egypt, Sinai, Israel, Jordan, Syria, Iraq, Kuwait, Lebanon, Saudi Arabia, United Arab Emirates, Oman, eastern Africa)
- Metopoceras omar maritima (Sicily)
- Metopoceras omar caspica (Turkmenistran)
