= Metopoceras albarracina =

Scientific classification
- Kingdom: Animalia
- Phylum: Arthropoda
- Class: Insecta
- Order: Lepidoptera
- Superfamily: Noctuoidea
- Family: Noctuidae
- Genus: Metopoceras
- Species: M. albarracina

Binomial name
- Metopoceras albarracina Hampson, 1918

Synonyms
- Metopoceras bubacecki Schawerda, 1924

Species of moth found in the Sierra de Albarracín, Aragon, Spain

Metopoceras albarracina is a moth of the family Noctuidae. It is found in the Sierra de Albarracín, Aragon, Spain.

Adults are on wing from May to June.

The larvae feed on herbaceous species.
