= Bezas =

- Municipality
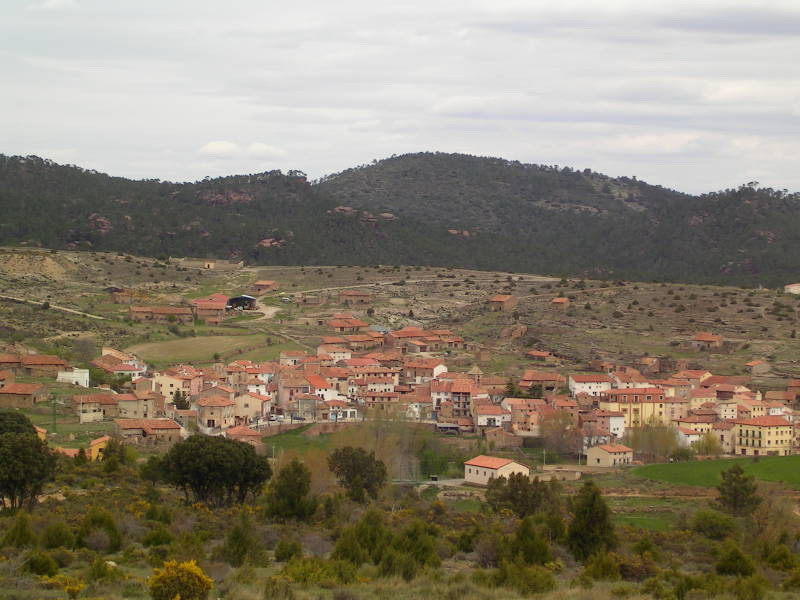

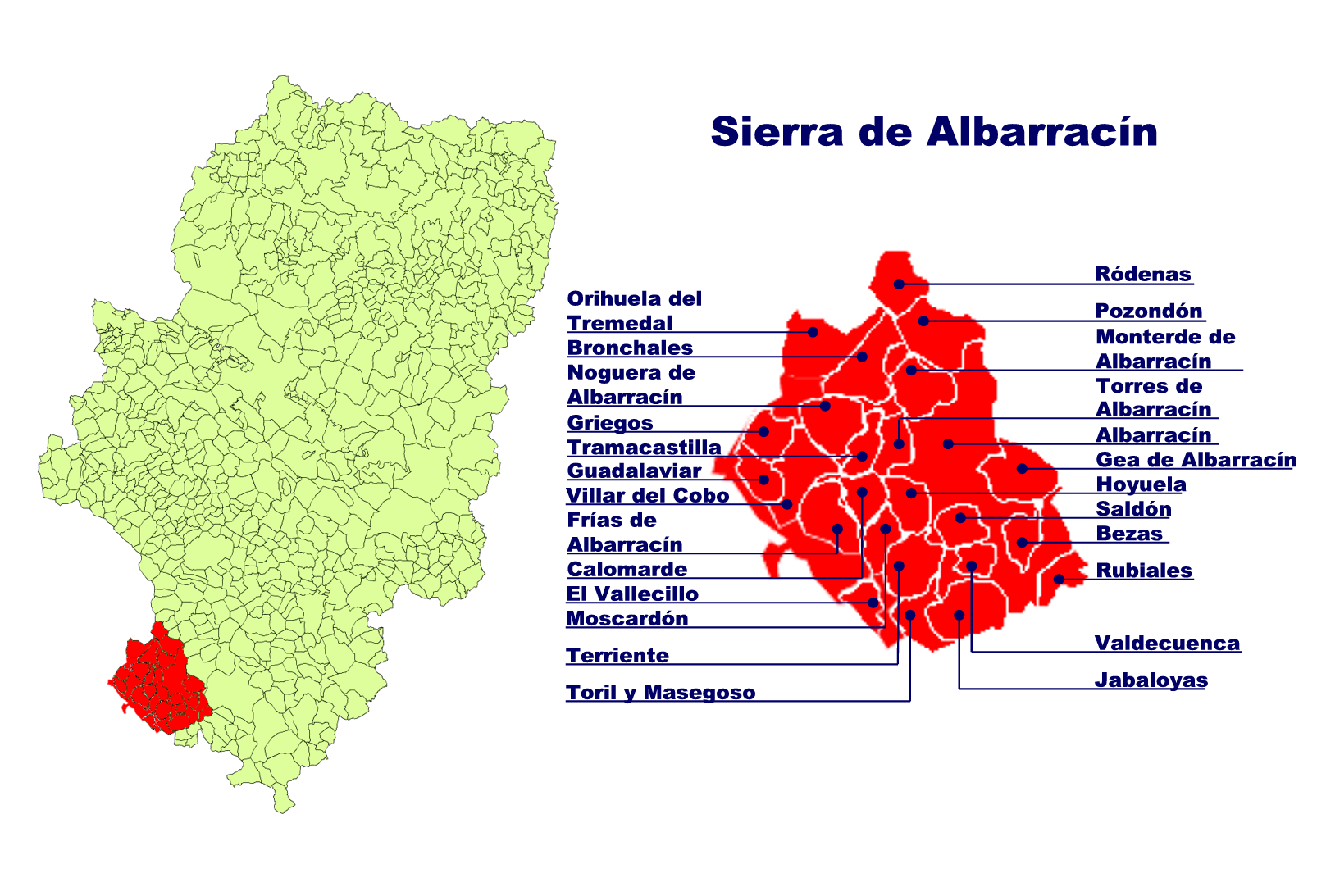

- Location in Spain
- Coordinates: 40°20′0″N 1°19′0″W
- Country: Spain
- Autonomous community: Aragón
- Province: Teruel
- Comarca: Sierra de Albarracín
- [[Judicial districts of Spain}Judicial district]]: Teruel

Government
  - Alcalde: Alejandro Alonso Martínez (2007) (PSOE)

Area
  - Total: 26.32 km^{2} (10.16 sq mi)
- Elevation: 1,165 m (3,822 ft)

Population (2025-01-01)
  - Total: 73
  - Density: 2.8/km^{2} (7.2/sq mi)
- Demonym: Becense
- Time zone: UTC+1 (CET)
  - Summer (DST): UTC+2 (CEST)
- Postal code: 44121
- Website: Official website

Bezas is a municipality located in the province of Teruel, Aragon, Spain. According to the 2004 census (INE), the municipality has a population of 76 inhabitants.

== Photo gallery ==
Bezas pictures

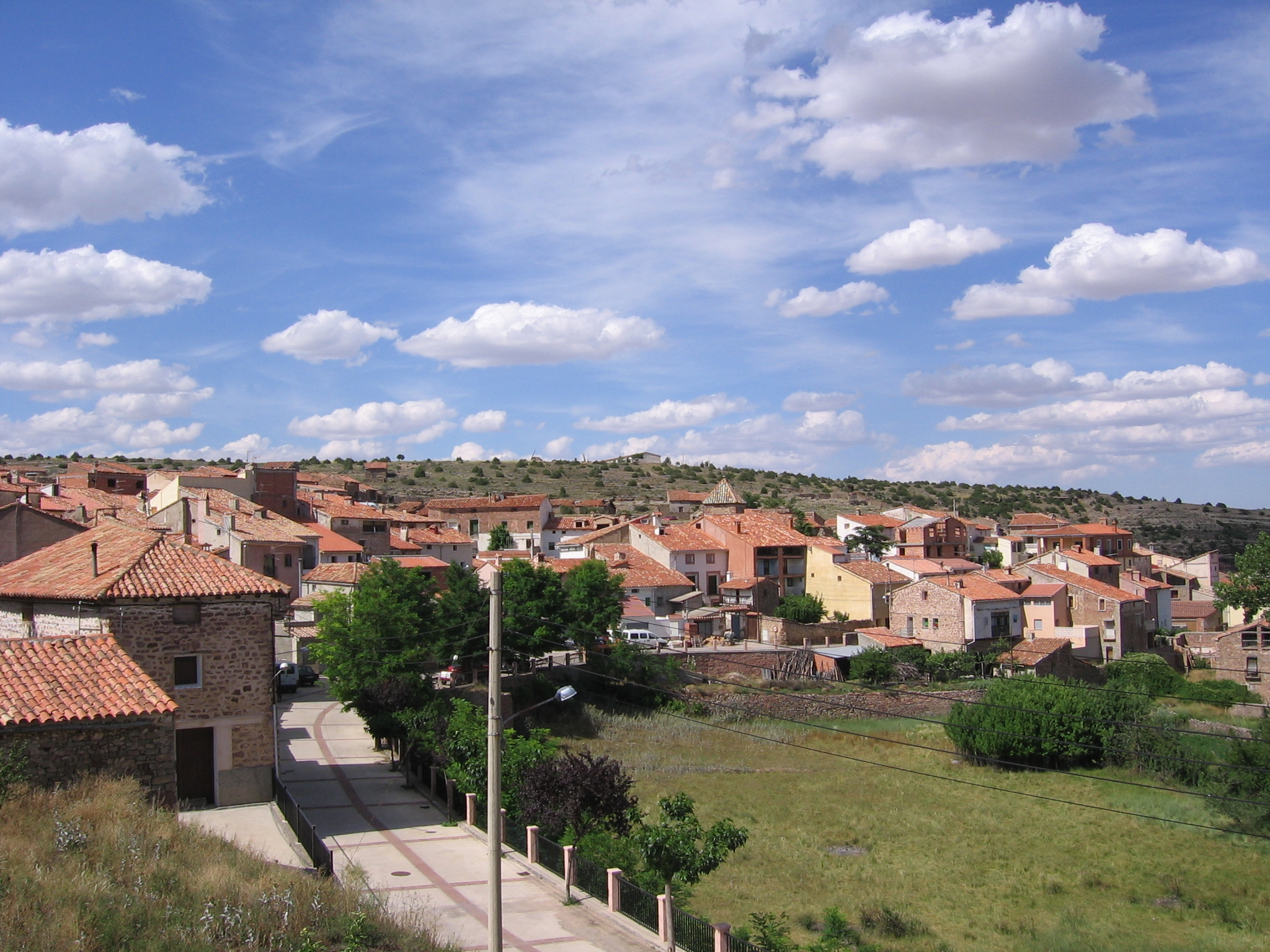

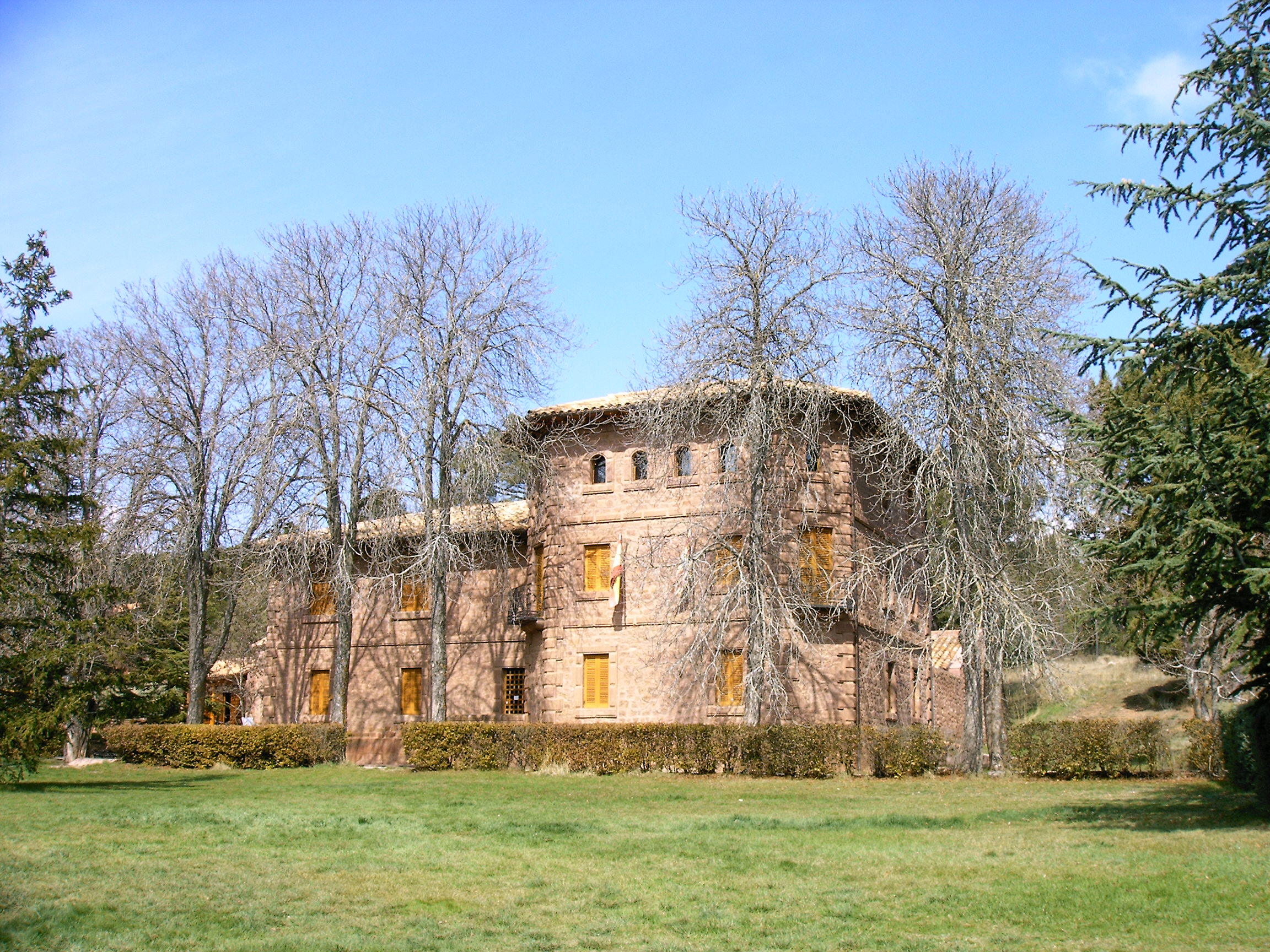

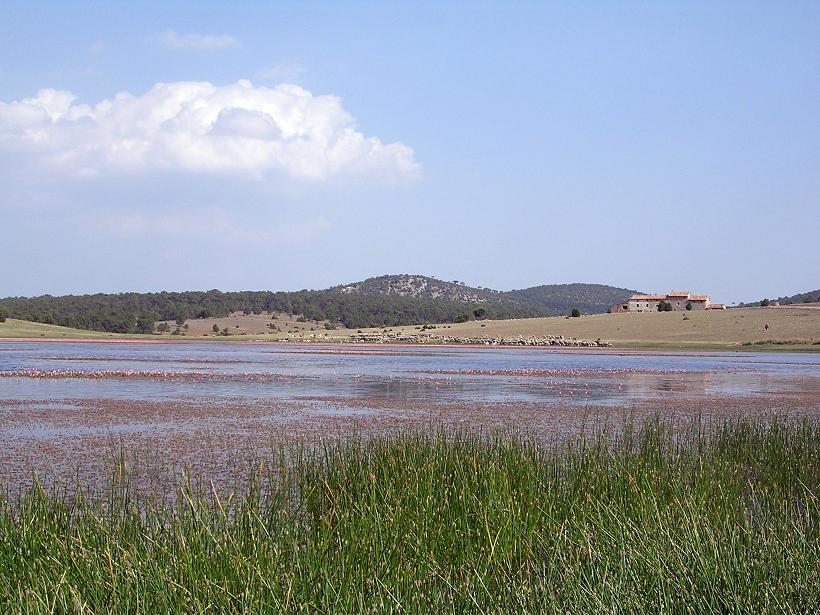

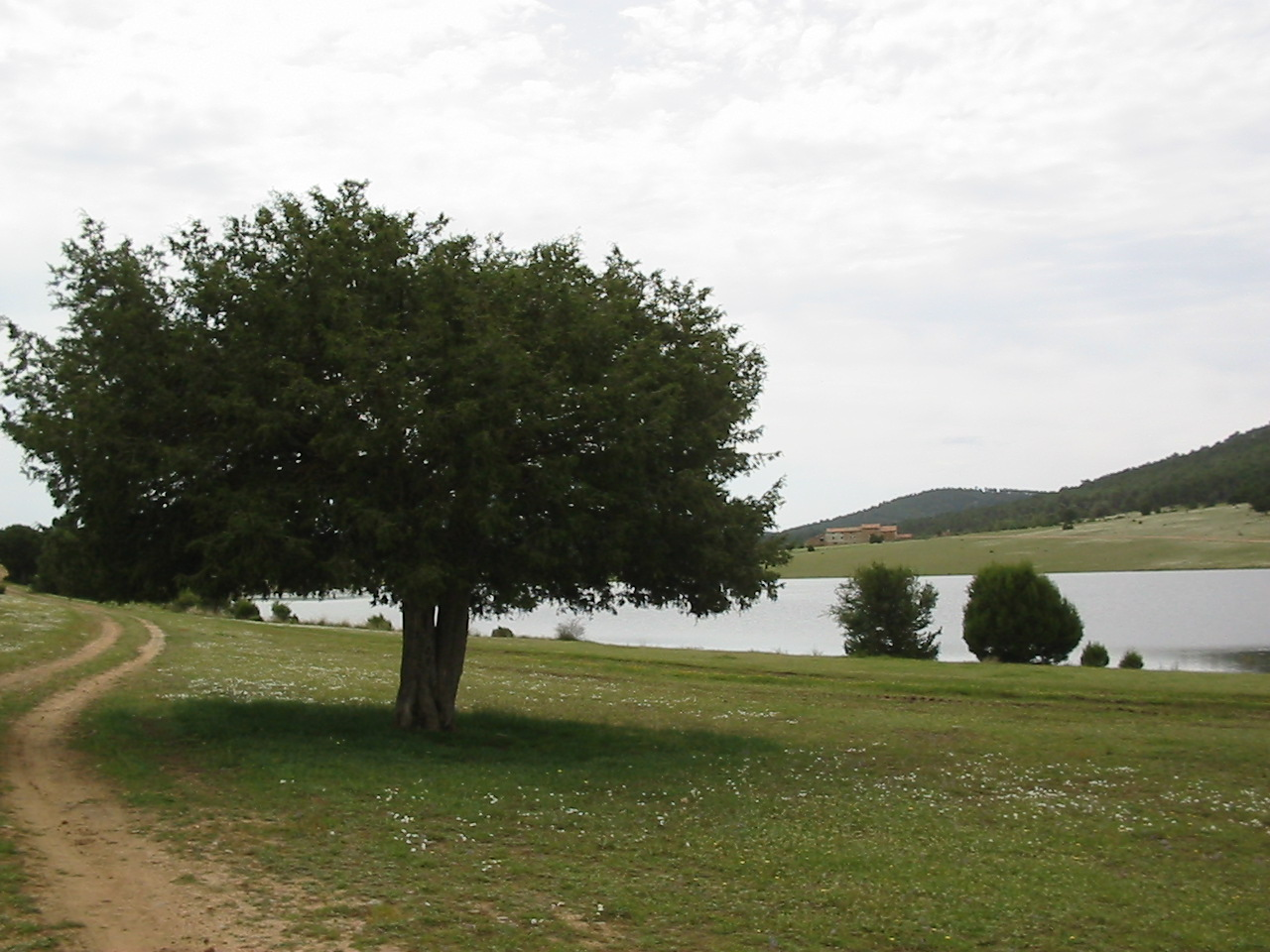

== See also ==
- List of municipalities in Teruel
