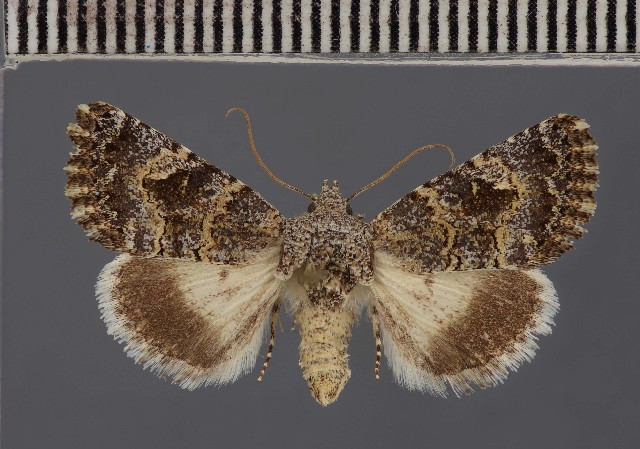

Scientific classification
- Kingdom: Animalia
- Phylum: Arthropoda
- Class: Insecta
- Order: Lepidoptera
- Superfamily: Noctuoidea
- Family: Noctuidae
- Genus: Metopoceras
- Species: M. kneuckeri

Binomial name
- Metopoceras kneuckeri (Rebel, 1903)

Synonyms
- Acrobyla kneuckeri Rebel, 1903

= Metopoceras kneuckeri =

Species of moth

Metopoceras kneuckeri is a moth of the family Noctuidae first described by Hans Rebel in 1903. It is found in northwest Africa, Pakistan, and the United Arab Emirates.

The wingspan is about 26 mm. Adults are on wing from March to April. There is one generation per year.

The larvae probably feed on babul trees.

== Subspecies ==
- Metopoceras kneuckeri kneuckeri
- Metopoceras kneuckeri gloriosa (Algeria, Morocco, Mauretania, Canary Islands)
- Metopoceras kneuckeri ariefera (Oman, Bahrain, Iran, Pakistan)
