= Noguera de Albarracín =

- Municipality
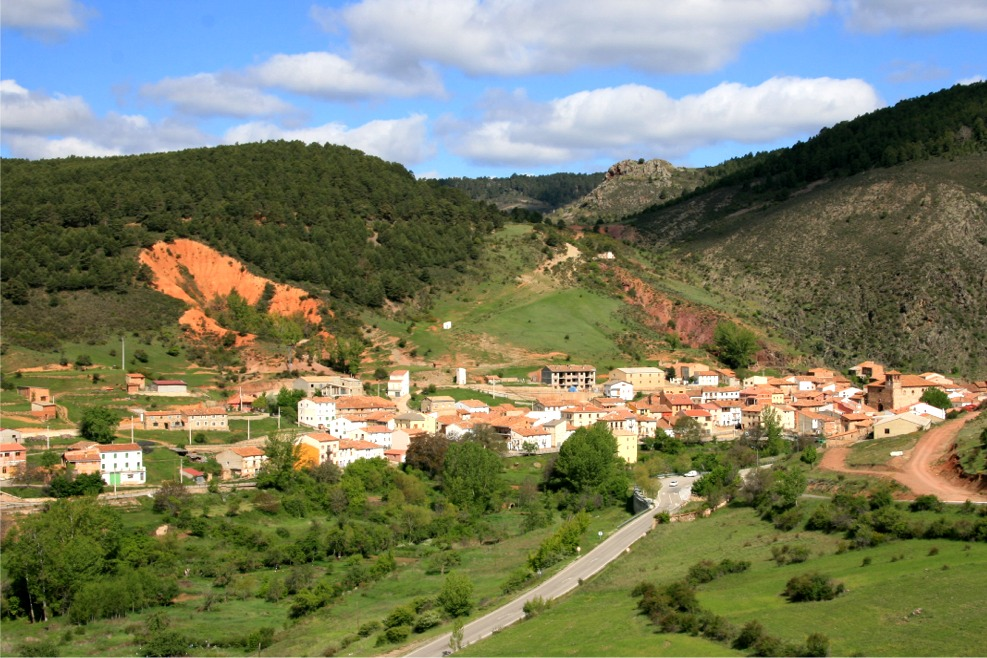

- Location in Aragon Location in Spain
- Coordinates: 40°28′N 1°35′W
- Country: Spain
- Autonomous community: Aragon
- Province: Teruel
- Comarca: Sierra de Albarracín

Government
  - Mayor: Juan Diego Puerto Lozano (Since 2019) (PP-Aragón)

Area
  - Total: 47.44 km^{2} (18.32 sq mi)
- Elevation: 1,386 m (4,547 ft)

Population (2025-01-01)
  - Total: 131
  - Density: 2.76/km^{2} (7.15/sq mi)
- Time zone: UTC+1 (CET)
  - Summer (DST): UTC+2 (CEST)
- Website: nogueradealbarracin.es

Noguera de Albarracín is a municipality located in the province of Teruel, Aragon, Spain. According to the 2004 census (INE), the municipality has a population of 161 inhabitants.

== See also ==
- List of municipalities in Teruel
