= Metopoceras delicata =

Scientific classification
- Kingdom: Animalia
- Phylum: Arthropoda
- Class: Insecta
- Order: Lepidoptera
- Superfamily: Noctuoidea
- Family: Noctuidae
- Genus: Metopoceras
- Species: M. delicata

Binomial name
- Metopoceras delicata (Staudinger, 1898)

Synonyms
- Nudifrons delicata Staudinger, 1898; Metopoceras gauckleri Pungeler, 1905; Metopoceras gaucleri Hampson, 1906

Species of moth

Metopoceras delicata is a moth of the family Noctuidae first described by Otto Staudinger in 1898. It is found in the Arabian Peninsula, Iraq, Turkey, Israel, Jordan and Syria.

The wingspan is about 25 mm. Adults are on wing in April. There is one generation per year.
