= Metopoceras felicina =

Scientific classification
- Domain: Eukaryota
- Kingdom: Animalia
- Phylum: Arthropoda
- Class: Insecta
- Order: Lepidoptera
- Superfamily: Noctuoidea
- Family: Noctuidae
- Genus: Metopoceras
- Species: M. felicina

Binomial name
- Metopoceras felicina (Donzel, 1844)

Synonyms
- Polia felicina Donzel, 1844

Species of moth

Metopoceras felicina is a moth of the family Noctuidae. It is found in Portugal, Spain, the Canary Islands, and the western parts of the Maghreb countries. This is a thermophilous species found in Thermo and Meso-Mediterranean habitats with xerophilous grasslands and light scrubland.

Adults are on wing from February to June. There is one generation per year.

== Subspecies ==
- Metopoceras felicina felicina
- Metopoceras felicina calderana (Canary Islands)
- Metopoceras felicina purpurariae (Canary Islands)
