= Metopoceras driss =

Scientific classification
- Domain: Eukaryota
- Kingdom: Animalia
- Phylum: Arthropoda
- Class: Insecta
- Order: Lepidoptera
- Superfamily: Noctuoidea
- Family: Noctuidae
- Genus: Metopoceras
- Species: M. driss

Binomial name
- Metopoceras driss Rungs, 1952

Species of moth

Metopoceras driss is a moth of the family Noctuidae. It is found in Morocco and has been found once in Spain.
