= Metopoceras philbyi =

Scientific classification
- Kingdom: Animalia
- Phylum: Arthropoda
- Class: Insecta
- Order: Lepidoptera
- Superfamily: Noctuoidea
- Family: Noctuidae
- Genus: Metopoceras
- Species: M. philbyi

Binomial name
- Metopoceras philbyi Wiltshire, 1980

Species of moth

Metopoceras philbyi is a moth of the family Noctuidae first described by Wiltshire in 1980. It is endemic to western Arabia and is known from various locations on the Arabian Peninsula as well as in Jordan and Israel.

Adults are on wing from March to April. There is one generation per year.
