= Alcoroches =

Alcoroches, Spain
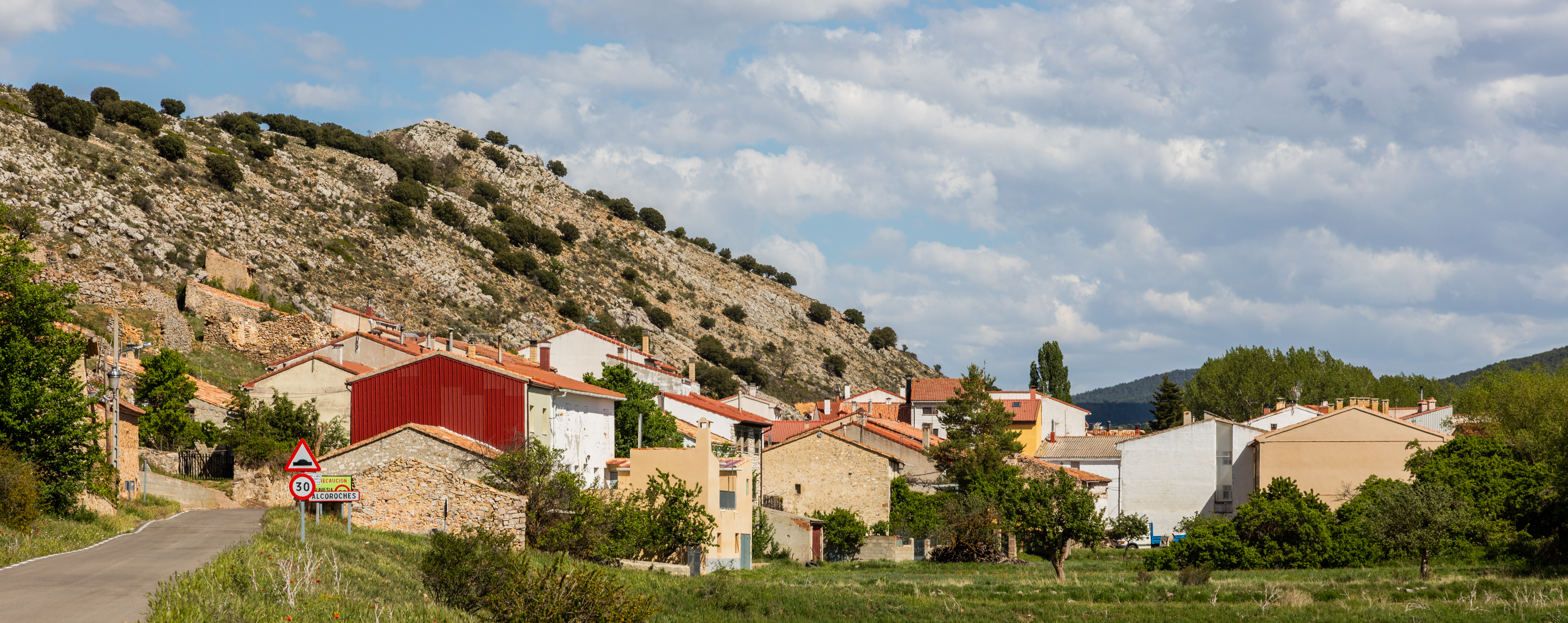

- Coat of arms

- Location within Province of Guadalajara Location within Castilla-La Mancha Location within Spain
- Coordinates: 40°37′41″N 1°44′42″W
- Country: Spain
- Autonomous community: Castile-La Mancha
- Province: Guadalajara
- Municipality: Alcoroches

Area
  - Total: 32 km^{2} (12 sq mi)

Population (2025-01-01)
  - Total: 117
  - Density: 3.7/km^{2} (9.5/sq mi)
- Time zone: UTC+1 (CET)
  - Summer (DST): UTC+2 (CEST)

Alcoroches is a municipality located in the province of Guadalajara, Castile-La Mancha, Spain. According to the 2004 census (INE), the municipality has a population of 167 inhabitants.
