= Adobes, Spain =

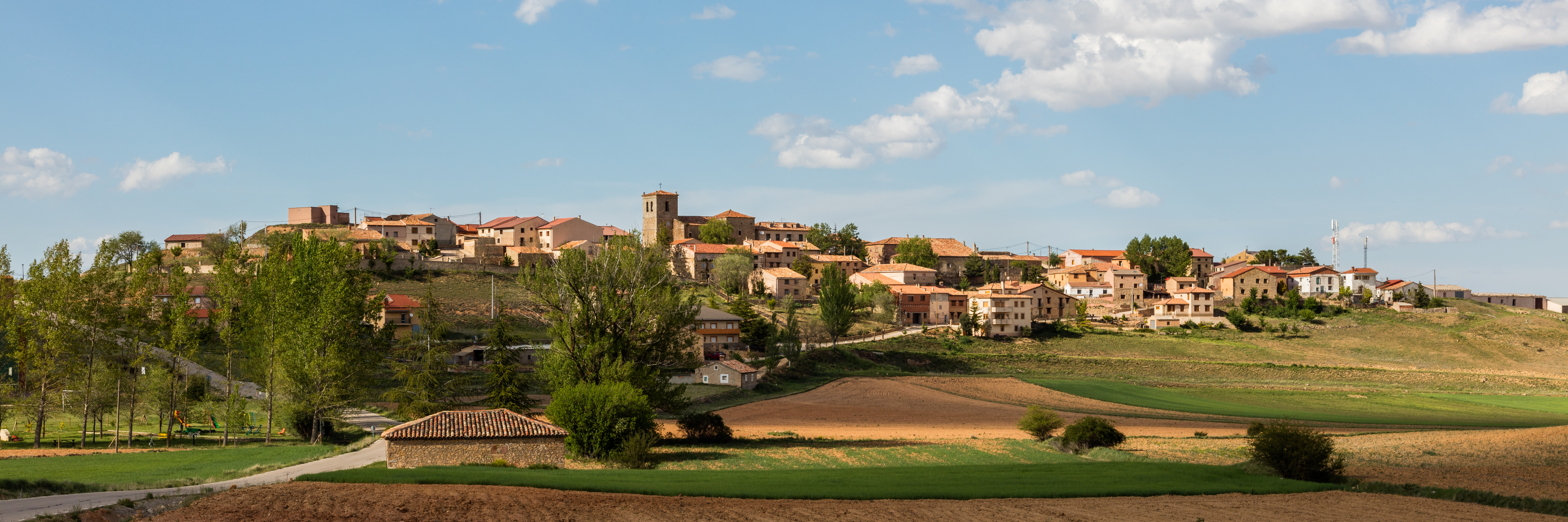

- Location within Province of Guadalajara Location within Castilla-La Mancha Location within Spain
- Coordinates: 40°40′33″N 1°40′43″W
- Country: Spain
- Autonomous community: Castile-La Mancha
- Province: Guadalajara
- Municipality: Adobes

Area
  - Total: 32.66 km^{2} (12.61 sq mi)

Population (2025-01-01)
  - Total: 28
  - Density: 0.86/km^{2} (2.2/sq mi)
- Time zone: UTC+1 (CET)
  - Summer (DST): UTC+2 (CEST)

Adobes is a municipality located in the province of Guadalajara, Castile-La Mancha, Spain. According to the 2004 census (INE), the municipality had a population of 68 inhabitants. As of the 2018 census, there were 31 inhabitants.
