= Orea =

Orea, Spain
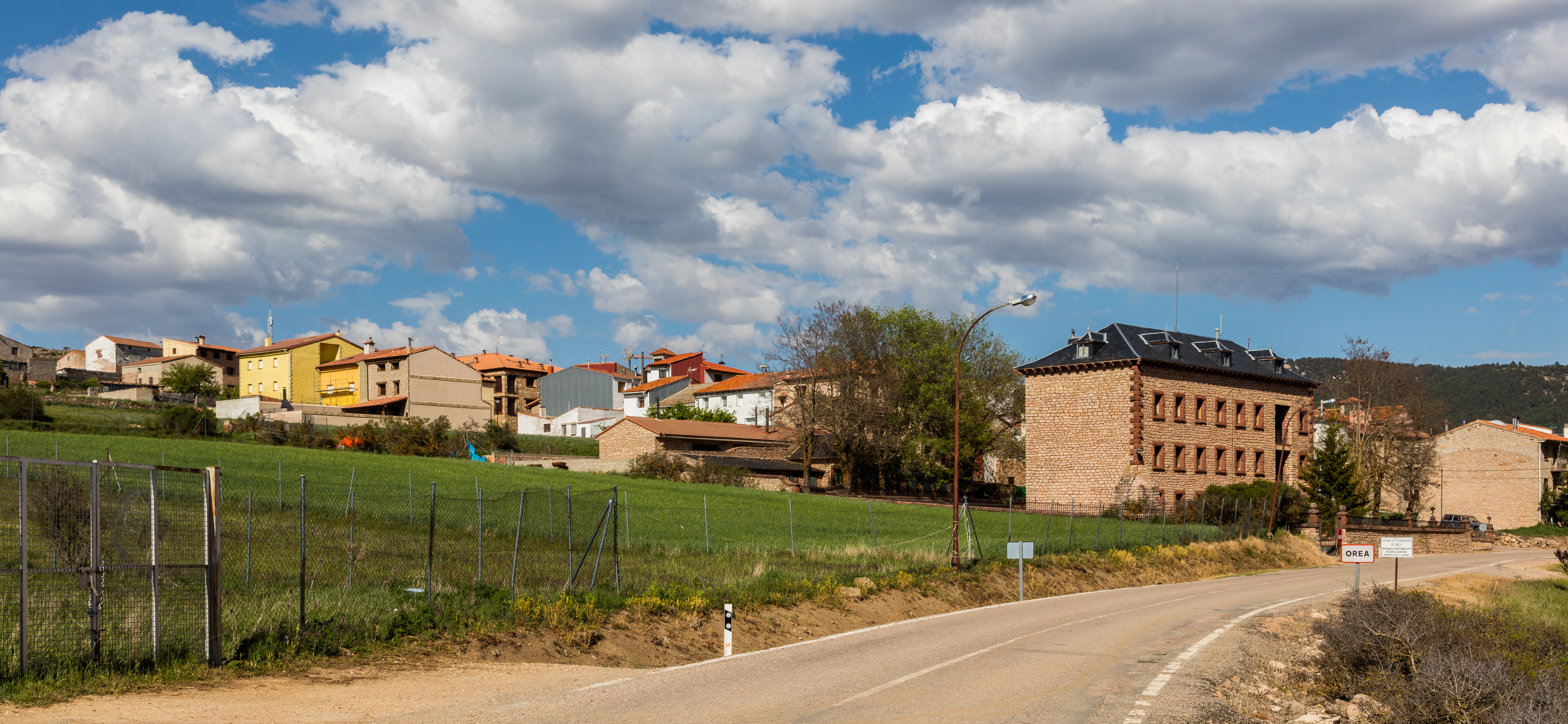

- Coat of arms

- Location within Province of Guadalajara Location within Castilla-La Mancha Location within Spain
- Country: Spain
- Autonomous community: Castile-La Mancha
- Province: Guadalajara
- Municipality: Orea

Area
  - Total: 71.25 km^{2} (27.51 sq mi)
- Elevation: 1,502 m (4,928 ft)

Population (2025-01-01)
  - Total: 191
  - Density: 2.68/km^{2} (6.94/sq mi)
- Time zone: UTC+1 (CET)
  - Summer (DST): UTC+2 (CEST)

Orea is a municipality located in the province of Guadalajara, Castile-La Mancha, Spain. According to the 2004 census (INE), the municipality had a population of 258 inhabitants.
