= Sierra de Albarracín =

Mountain range in the southwestern end of the Iberian System

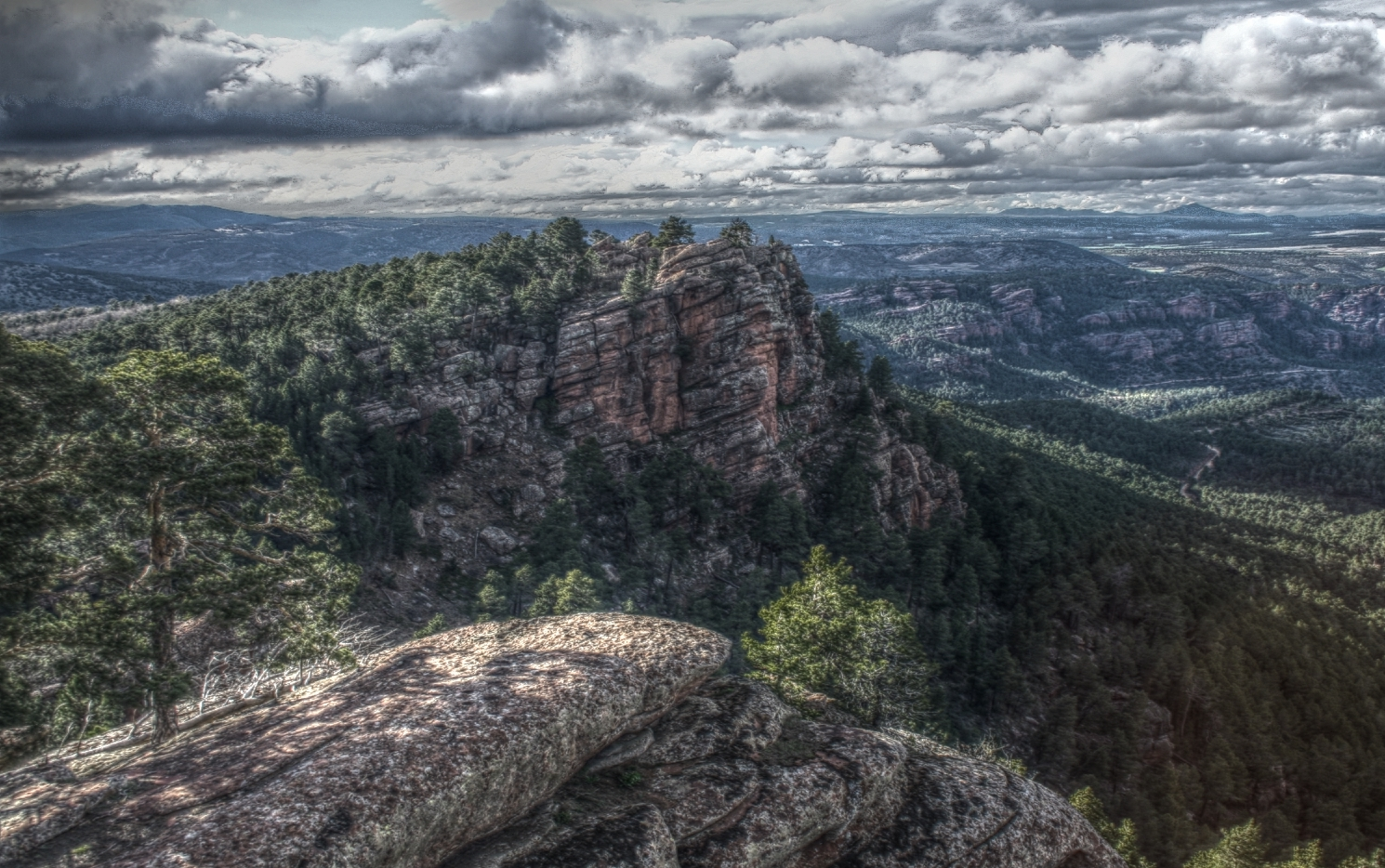
- View of the Sierra de Albarracín

Highest point
- Elevation: 1,856 m (6,089 ft)
- Listing: Mountains of Aragon, List of mountains in the Valencian Community
- Coordinates: 40°29′10″N 1°36′55″W

Geography
- Location within Spain
- Location: Gúdar-Javalambre, Aragon; Rincón de Ademuz and Serrans, Valencian Community
- Parent range: Iberian System, Eastern zone

Geology
- Mountain type: Shale (Late Ordovician)

Climbing
- Easiest route: From the towns of Albarracín or Monterde de Albarracín

Sierra de Albarracín is a 28 km (17 mi) long mountain range in the southwestern end of the Iberian System. Its highest point is the 1,856 m high summit known as Sierra Alta.

== Description ==
This mountain range is named after the town of Albarracín, located at a height of 1,200 m. At the same time it gives its name to the Sierra de Albarracín comarca of Aragon, Spain. Monterde de Albarracín is located at the northern end of the range.

The Sierra de Albarracín is a rough-looking mountain chain with pine, oak and juniper forests and also many patches where the rock is exposed. Its summits are usually covered in snow in the winter and the average temperature is of 11 °C. It was formerly one of the most lonely and desolate areas of Spain and there were not even marked paths crossing its impenetrable forests and jagged ridges.

Metopoceras albarracina is an endemic moth of these mountains.

== See also ==
- Albarracín
- Monterde de Albarracín
- List of mountains in Aragon
