= Orihuela del Tremedal =

- Municipality
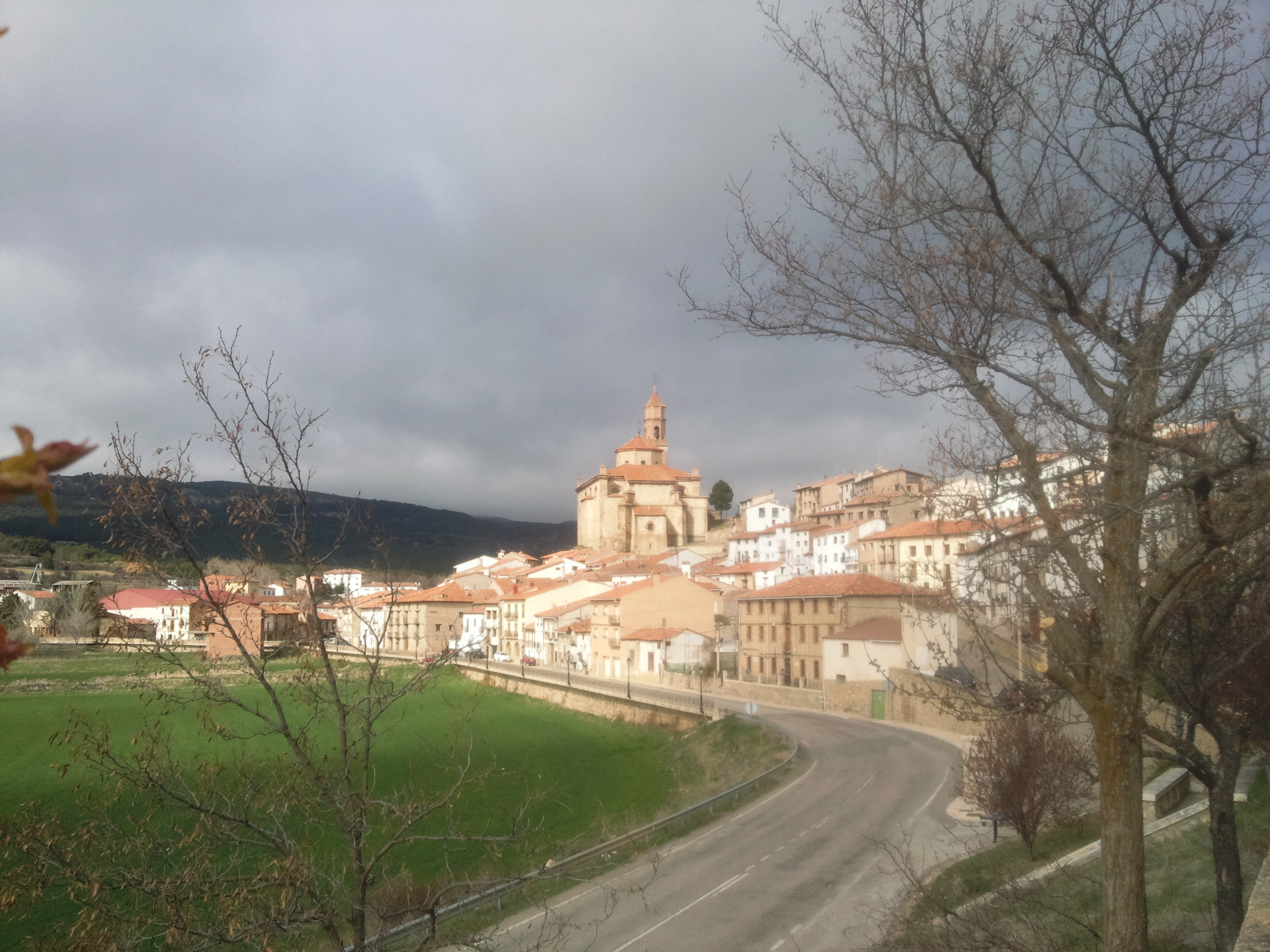

- Coat of arms

- Location in Aragon Location in Spain
- Coordinates: 40°33′N 1°39′W
- Country: Spain
- Autonomous community: Aragon
- Province: Teruel
- Comarca: Sierra de Albarracín

Area
  - Total: 71.40 km^{2} (27.57 sq mi)
- Elevation: 1,447 m (4,747 ft)

Population (2025-01-01)
  - Total: 450
  - Density: 6.3/km^{2} (16/sq mi)
- Time zone: UTC+1 (CET)
  - Summer (DST): UTC+2 (CEST)
- Website: orihueladeltremedal.es

Orihuela del Tremedal is a municipality located in the province of Teruel, Aragon, Spain. According to the 2004 census (INE), the municipality had a population of 605 inhabitants.

== See also ==
- List of municipalities in Teruel
