= Monterde de Albarracín =

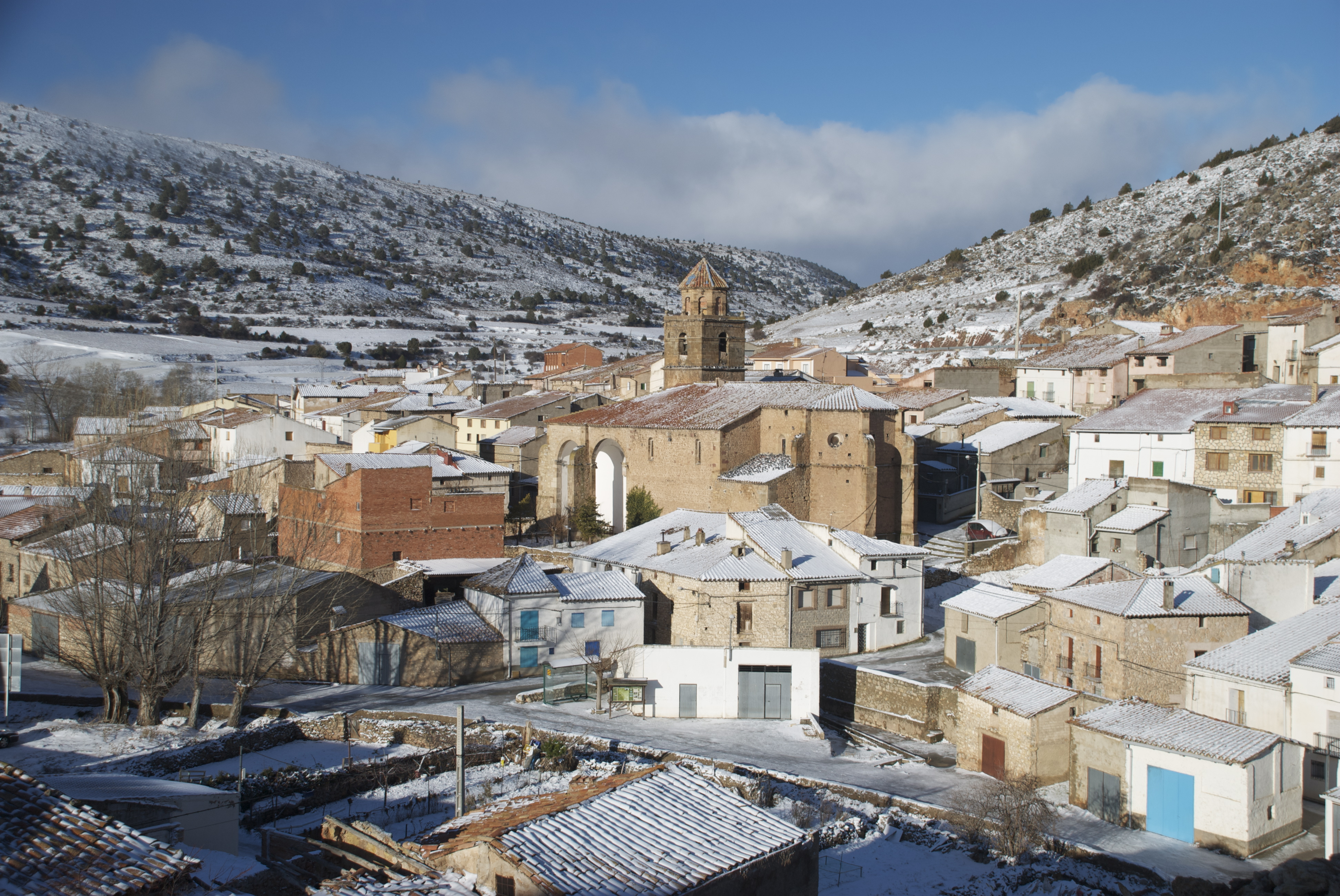

- Location within Spain
- Coordinates: 40°30′N 1°29′W
- Country: Spain
- Autonomous community: Aragon
- Province: Teruel subdivision_type3 = Comarca

Area
  - Total: 45.12 km^{2} (17.42 sq mi)
- Elevation: 1,280 m (4,200 ft)

Population (2025-01-01)
  - Total: 62
  - Density: 1.4/km^{2} (3.6/sq mi)
- Time zone: UTC+1 (CET)
  - Summer (DST): UTC+2 (CEST)

Monterde de Albarracín is a municipality in the province of Teruel, Aragon, Spain. According to the 2010 census the municipality had a population of 69 inhabitants. Its postal code is 44368. It has an area of 45.12 km^{2}. There is a church from the sixteenth century in Monterde de Albarracín.

The town is located in the mountains of the Iberian System.

== See also ==
- Sierra de Albarracín Comarca
- List of municipalities in Teruel
