= Pozondón =

Pozondón, Spain
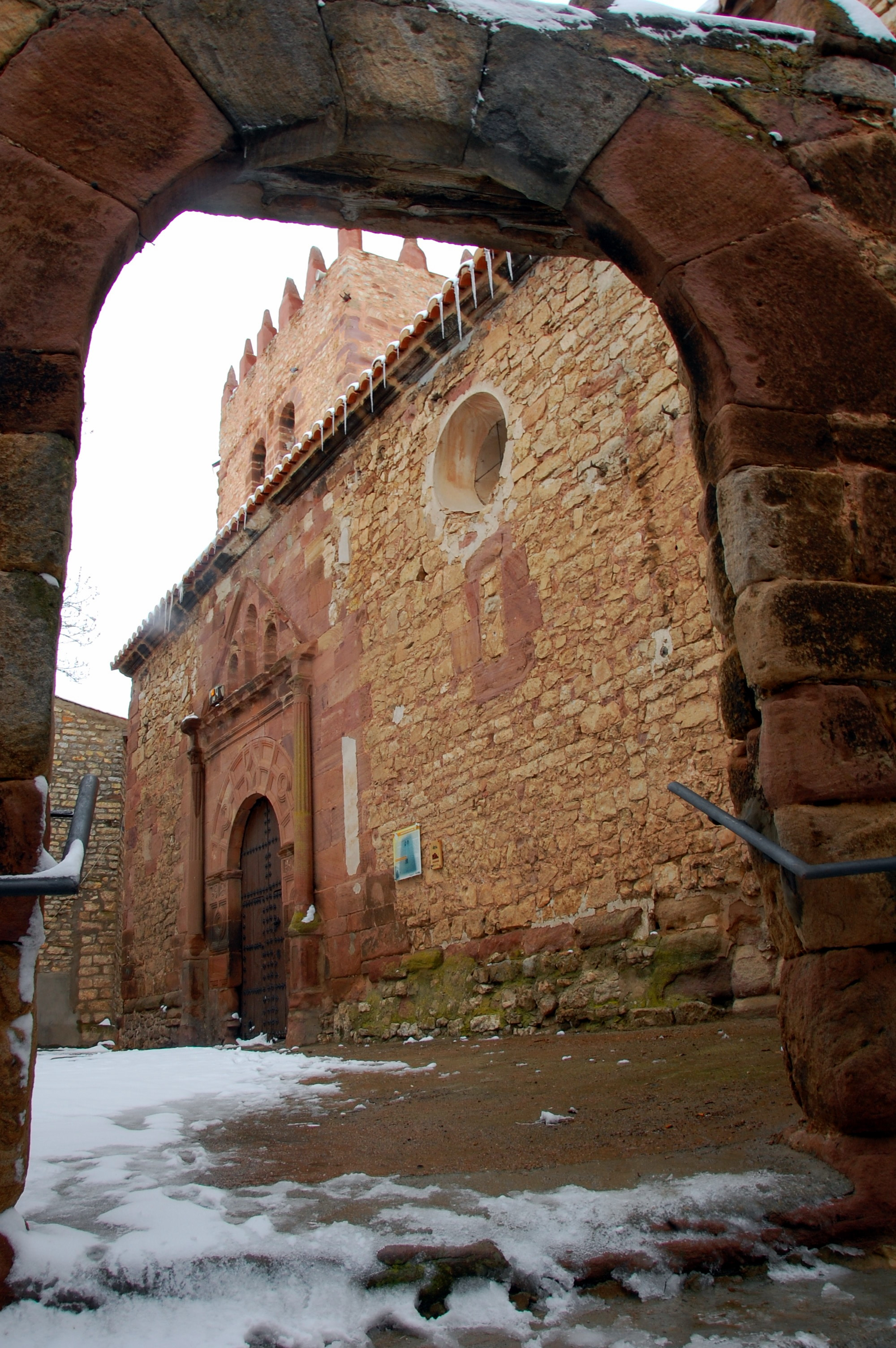

- Location within Spain
- Coordinates: 40°34′N 1°28′W
- Country: Spain
- Autonomous community: Aragon
- Province: Teruel
- Municipality: Pozondón

Area
  - Total: 67.64 km^{2} (26.12 sq mi)
- Elevation: 1,407 m (4,616 ft)

Population (2025-01-01)
  - Total: 53
  - Density: 0.78/km^{2} (2.0/sq mi)
- Time zone: UTC+1 (CET)
  - Summer (DST): UTC+2 (CEST)

Pozondón is a municipality located in the province of Teruel, Aragon, Spain. According to the 2004 census (INE), the municipality has a population of 97 inhabitants.

In the plains of Pozondón there are several types of sinkholes.

== See also ==
- List of municipalities in Teruel
