= Ródenas =

- municipality
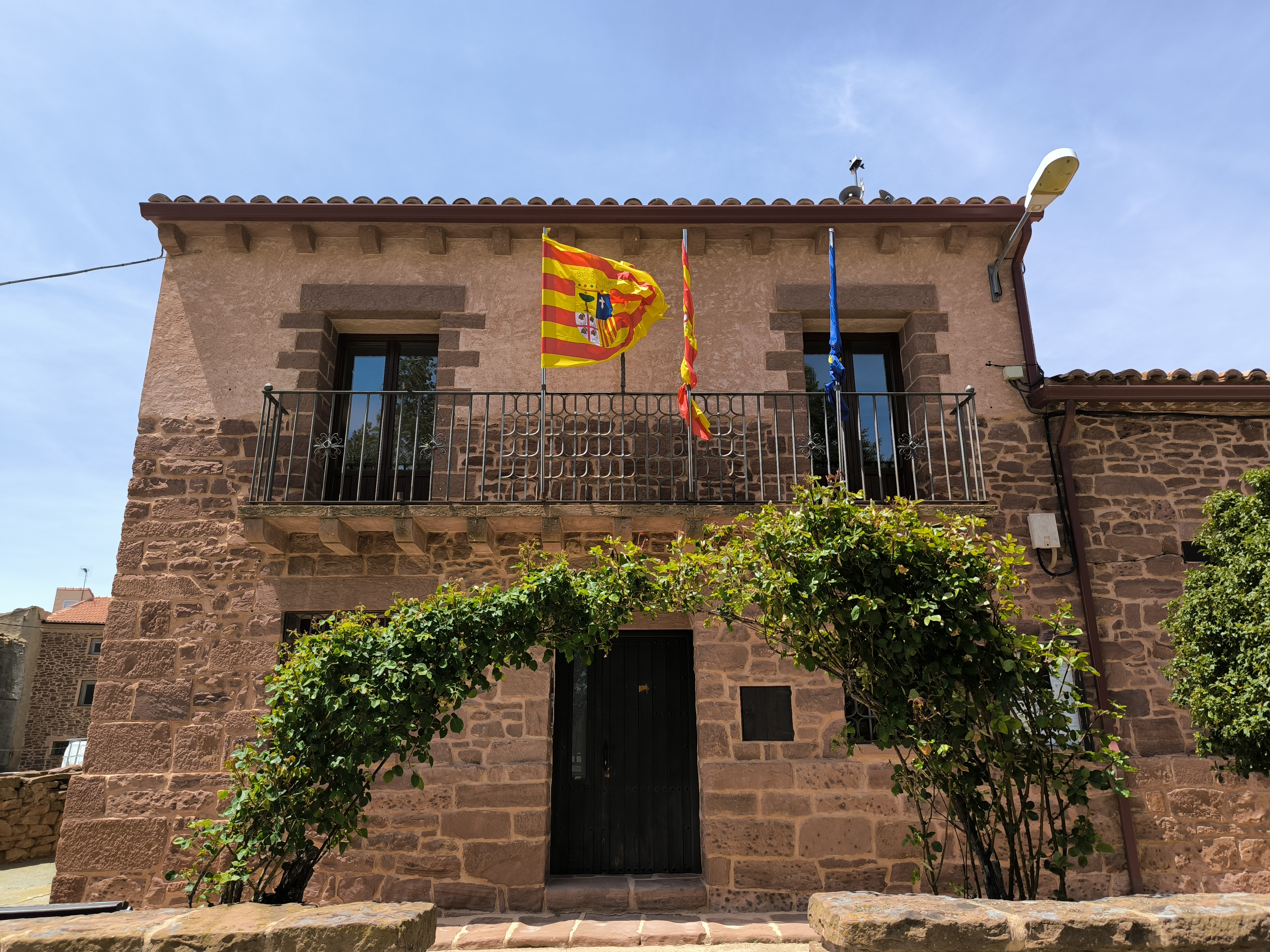
- Town hall

- Flag Coat of arms

- Location within Spain
- Coordinates: 40°39′N 1°31′W
- Country: Spain
- Autonomous community: Aragon
- Province: Teruel
- Municipality: Ródenas

Area
  - Total: 44 km^{2} (17 sq mi)

Population (2025-01-01)
  - Total: 57
  - Density: 1.3/km^{2} (3.4/sq mi)
- Time zone: UTC+1 (CET)
  - Summer (DST): UTC+2 (CEST)

Ródenas (Spanish pronunciation: [ˈroðenas]) is a municipality located in the province of Teruel, Aragon, Spain. According to the 2004 census (INE), the municipality has a population of 88 inhabitants.

== See also ==
- List of municipalities in Teruel
