= Pedomicrobium =

Scientific classification
- Domain: Bacteria
- Kingdom: Pseudomonadati
- Phylum: Pseudomonadota
- Class: Alphaproteobacteria
- Order: Hyphomicrobiales
- Family: Hyphomicrobiaceae
- Genus: Pedomicrobium; Aristovskaya 1961

Type species
- Pedomicrobium ferrugineum

Species
- P. americanum P. australicum P. ferrugineum P. manganicum

Genus of bacteria

Pedomicrobium is a ubiquitous bacterium dominant in biofilms of man-made aquatic environments such as water distribution systems and bioreactors. Due to their abilities to oxidise manganese (Mn), they are found to be the main culprits of Mn related “dirty water” (Sly et al., 1988a).

== Taxonomy and ecology of Pedomicrobium ==
=== Taxonomy ===
Based on 16S rRNA sequence analysis, Pedomicrobium is a bacterium that belongs to the family Hyphomicrobiaceae, within the order of Hyphomicrobiales under the class of Alphaproteobacteria, in the phylum Pseudomonadota (Garrity et al., 2001). There are twenty genera in the family Hyphomicrobiaceae (Williams et al., 1990), of which Pedomicrobium is most closely related to Hyphomicrobium and Filomicrobium (Stahl et al., 1992).

The genus Pedomicrobium consists of four species, with Mn oxidizing and accumulating species represented by Pedomicrobium manganicum and Pedomicrobium americanum, whilst the species Pedomicrobium ferrugineum oxidizes iron but not Mn (Cox and Sly, 1997).

=== Ecology ===
Pedomicrobium are budding hyphal bacteria found in both terrestrial and aquatic environments (Sly et al., 1988a). The dimorphic mode of reproduction results in a non-motile form, which has the ability to adhere strongly to surfaces and form biofilm (Sly et al., 1988b). The attached cells take advantage of the nutrients and soluble manganous ions attracted to the solid–liquid interface, which are continually replenished by the water flow (Sly et al., 1988a). Mn oxidising bacteria in biofilms have been shown to greatly enhance the rate of Mn oxidation (Sly et al., 1988b).

== Oxidation of manganese by Pedomicrobium ==
The association of Mn oxides with the surfaces of microbial cells is well known (Larsen et al., 1999). Oxidation of Mn by Pedomicrobium has been shown to occur enzymatically, and the deposition of the manganous oxide occurs on extracellular acidic polysaccharides (Sly et al., 1990a; Larsen et al., 1999). The mechanism of Mn II oxidation by Pedomicrobium is a two-step process involving adsorption of Mn through surface charges and ionic attraction, and subsequent oxidation to Mn oxide (Larsen et al., 1999). Larsen et al. (1999) showed that the Mn oxidising enzyme was located in the outer cell membranes and that enzyme activity was copper-dependent. Recent research in the laboratory has shown that the gene encoding the Mn oxidising enzyme is a putative multicopper oxidase with four copper binding sites.

== Effects of manganese ==
Mn is considered a secondary contaminant, which includes substances in water that cause offensive taste, odour, colour, corrosion, foaming, or staining but have no direct effect on health (Herman, 1996). In fact, small concentrations of Mn in our diet are essential to human health (Keen et al., 1999).

Therefore, Mn is regarded as a nuisance metal in water distribution systems as in the insoluble oxide form it reduces the aesthetic quality of the water. The presence of Mn results in the accumulation of metal oxides in biofilm on the surfaces of water mains, which may slough off resulting in brown-black colour and turbidity that are characteristics of Mn related dirty water (Sly et al., 1990b). The sediments produced are responsible for the taste and staining properties of water, which commonly affects laundry, porcelain, dishes, utensils and swimming pools (Vaner et al., 1996).
