= Manuel Polo y Peyrolón =

Spanish writer, theorist, academic and politician

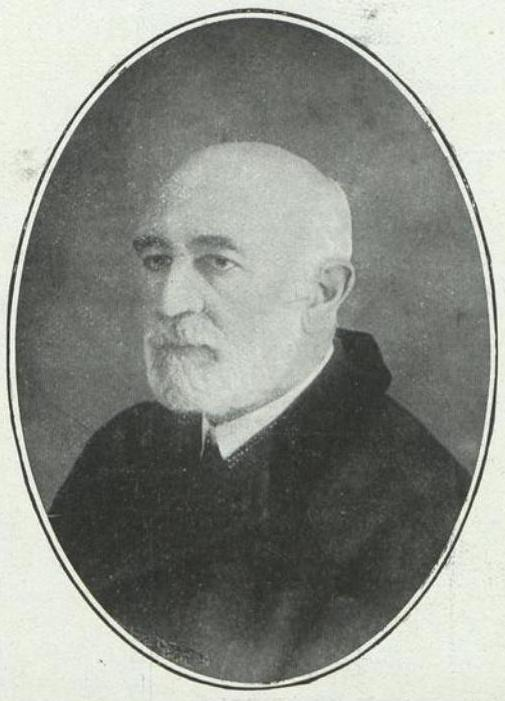
- Born: Manuel Polo y Peyrolón; 1846; Cañete, Spain
- Died: 1918 (aged 71–72); Valencia, Spain
- Occupation: scholar
- Known for: novelist
- Political party: Partido Carlista

Manuel Polo y Peyrolón (1846–1918) was a Spanish writer, theorist, academic, and politician. He is best known as the author of five novels falling in between romanticism and realism; classified as part of costumbrismo, they are currently considered second-rate literature. As a philosopher he stuck to neo-Thomism and focused mostly on confronting Krausism. In education he represented Catholic regenerationism, fiercely pitted against the Liberal current. In politics he was active within Carlism; his career reached its peak during his 1896–1898 term in the Congress of Deputies and his 1907-1915 terms in the Senate.

== Family and youth ==
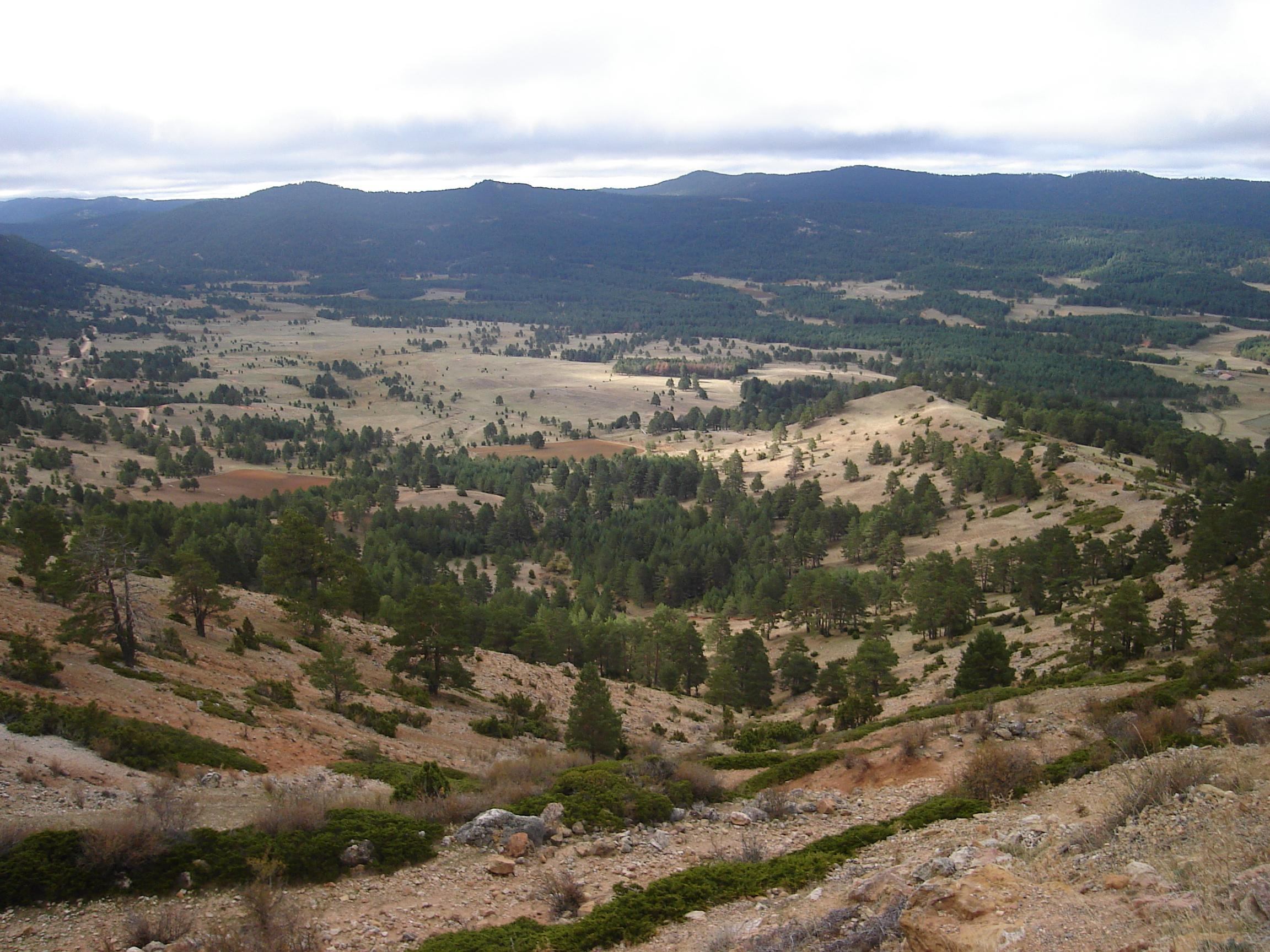
Alto Maestrazgo

There is little known about Polo's ancestors. His paternal forefathers were related to Aras de Alpuente, a town in the Valencia province; in the 17th century some Polos served there as local notaries. His father, Domingo Polo y Polo (died 1859), also originated from Aras. He worked as property registrar in Belchite and according to his son he was among the founders of the Carlist daily La Esperanza. During the First Carlist War he sided with the legitimists and served as secretary to general José María Arévalo y Reguero. Following the Carlist defeat he had to abandon his job and settled in Cañete, a village on the western slopes of Montes Universales, a southern ridge of Sistema Ibérico. Located in the Castillan Province of Cuenca, the area bordered the region of Aragón and formed part of what was once known as Alto Maestrazgo. Polo y Polo practiced as a local lawyer. Manuel's mother, María Peyrolón Lapuerta, was born in Aragon, on the other sides of the sierra slopes; she originated either from Calomarde or from Gea de Albarracin. The couple had at least two sons, Manuel and Florentino; María died during childbirth in 1853. Some time in the mid-1850s Domingo Polo developed very serious health problems and pledged that in case of recovery he would dedicate his life to God; indeed he later entered an unspecified religious order and became a friar.

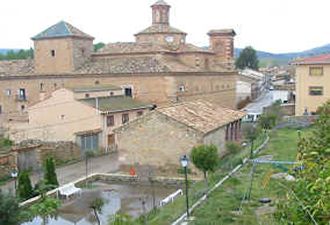
Gea de Albarracín, current view

Since the mid-1850s Manuel and his younger brother were looked after by their maternal aunt Concepción. Spending most of his childhood and youth with relatives in Gea de Albarracín, he considered himself a turolense and viewed Sierra de Albarracín as his "patria chica" (little homeland). He was brought up in a fervently Catholic environment and inherited a Traditionalist political outlook from his father; his first childhood lectures were Carlist booklets and periodicals. Following his early education in Albarracin, he frequented the institute in Valencia; exact dates are unclear, though most likely his college days were in the early 1860s. According to one source he majored in philosophy and literature at Universidad Central in Madrid and in civil and canon law at Universidad de Valencia. Guided by Miguel Vicente Almazán, Manuel would later gain PhD laurels in philosophy. According to another author, he studied both law and literature in Valencia; none of the sources consulted provides the date of his graduation. Following a brief and temporary stint as assistant professor of metaphysics in Valencia in 1868–69, he returned to Aragón and successfully applied to Instituto de Segunda Enseñanza de Teruel, where he began teaching psychology, logic, and ethics in 1870. Manuel Polo y Peyrolón never married and had no children.

== Novelist ==
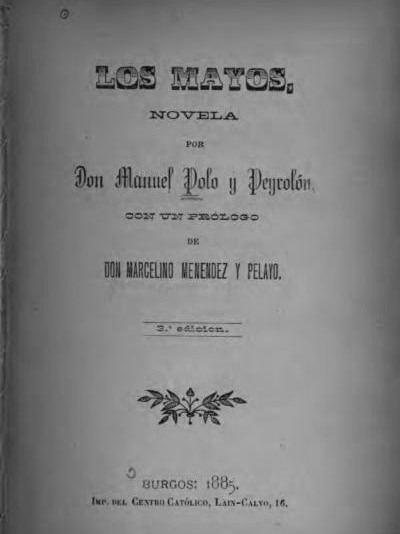
Los Mayos, 1885

Polo's first literary work, Realidad poética de mis montañas, appeared in 1873. Except that it was a collection of short stories instead of a novel, it revealed characteristics marking his later works: traditional themes, a simple plot and clear educational purpose, with narration set in the provincial milieu of Sierra de Albarracín, painted with attention to detail and with a focus on local customs typical rather of an ethnographical study. All these features were developed in Polo's first novel, Los Mayos (1878), a rural love story intended as a praise of loyalty and fidelity and considered his best work, translated into Italian and German. The consecutive ones, Sacramento y concubinato (1884) and Quién mal anda, ¿cómo acaba? (1890) assumed a more militant tone, aimed against liberal and secular lifestyles. Pacorro (1905) confronted the deeds of a young liberal with the virtues of a young Carlist, cast against the background of a small town undergoing the turbulent period of 1868–1876. The last of Polo's major literary works, El guerrillero (1906), revealed more threads of an adventure story; set during Third Carlist War, it was heavily based on wartime recollections of his brother Florentino. Polo's shorter stories remain scaled-down versions of his novels.

Among his contemporaries Polo was appreciated usually by those sharing a similar traditional outlook, such as Emilia Pardo Bazán and his friends Marcelinó Menéndez y Pelayo and José María de Pereda. A conservative literary review, Ilustración Católica, identified him as a brilliant follower of Fernán Caballero, classified his writings as a "novela de familia" (family novel) and hailed his prose as "restauradora de la novela castellana en los tiempos modernos" (the restorer of the Castilian novel in modern times). Noted for authenticity "which does not disfigure reality", his realism was appreciated as an antidote to naturalism – the trend he consciously opposed - and "the venom of Zola". By favourably disposed contemporaries he was put next to Fernán Caballero, de Pereda, Francisco Navarro Villoslada, Julio Alarcón y Meléndez, Juan Valera and padre Coloma; critics dubbed him a "mamarracho literario" (literary monstrosity.)

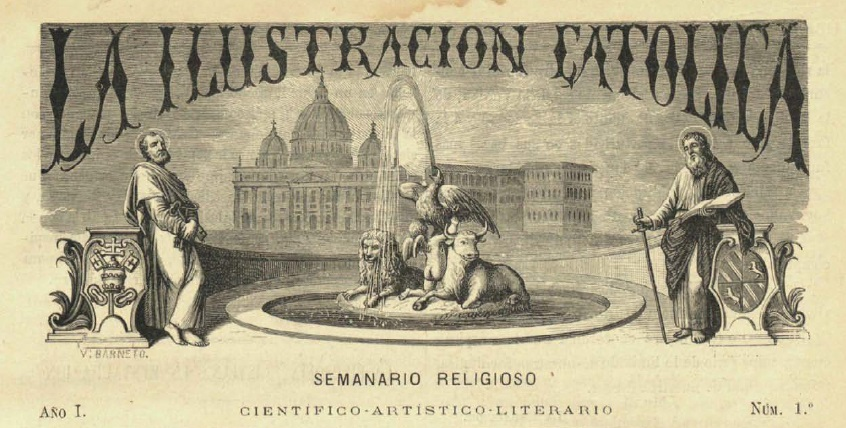
La Ilustración Católica

The limited popularity of Polo's works hardly outlived their author. Even in the early 20th century he was only marginally mentioned by historians of Spanish literature; later on he went into oblivion, though was occasionally acknowledged in anthologies. Today he is missing even in fairly detailed studies written either by Spanish of foreign scholars, though he is noted by some dictionaries. He is usually situated in between romanticism and realism, falling into the costumbrismo (or realismo costumbrista) trend, also a good representative of novelas de tesis. It is noted that his conventional, meager plots can hardly support the weight of nagging moralising objectives, especially given the repetitive nature of his works. On the other hand, his novels are appreciated as inexhaustible sources of perfectly captured anecdotes and customs, few readers admitting even some charm. Apart from realism, he is credited for introducing new narrative techniques. He is also among the best-known authors contributing to Carlism in literature from the legitimist perspective.

== Scholar and philosopher ==
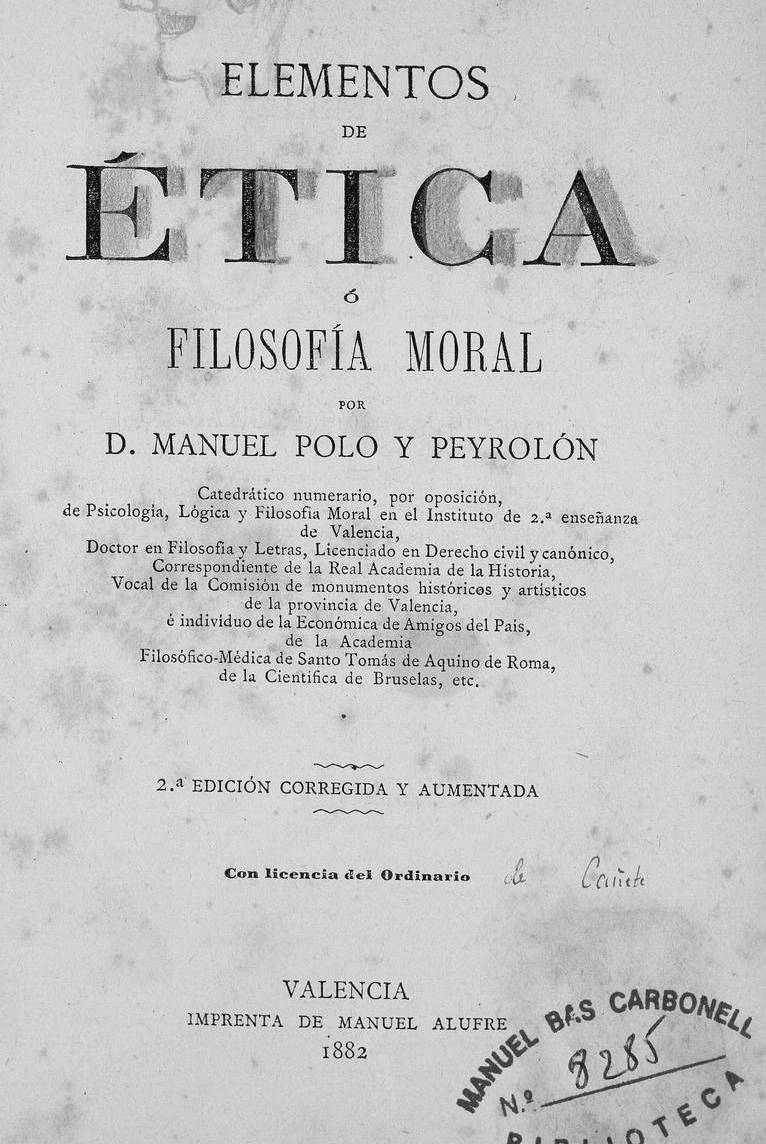
Polo's textbook, 1882

Polo taught psychology, logic, and ethics in the Teruel college for 9 years. Harassed for his pro-Carlist sympathies, he decided to leave Aragon. Following a successful application and selection process, he assumed the same chair at Instituto de Segunda Enseñanza in Valencia in 1879, where he kept teaching until the early 20th century. Member of Asociación de Catedráticos Numerarios, he was active in a number of Spanish and foreign scholarly institutions. His career was crowned in 1908, when he joined Real Academia de la Historia.

During his Valencia tenure Polo wrote textbooks for students of philosophy: Elementos de psicología (1879), Elementos de lógica (1880), Elementos de Ética (1880); Elementos de Ética o Filosofía Moral (1882), Elementos de Filosofía Moral (1889), Lógica elemental ( 1902) and Ética elemental (1902), in use also in other scholarly centres across the country. He did not develop any original philosophical contribution himself; apart from works on history and general overviews, Polo is known for confronting some trends forming the liberal educational mindset, especially Krausism and Darwinism. His stance is classified as neo-Thomist or neocatolicismo in philosophy and as regeneracionismo político-educativo in pedagogy.

Polo's repudiation of Krausism developed in the course of his teaching career and stemmed from his growing interest in pedagogy and education in general. During the last decades of the 19th century, Krausism became a philosophical powerhouse of liberal Spanish politics, represented mostly by Francisco Giner del Rios and Instituto Libre de Enseñanza. Its principal intellectual antagonist was Menendez y Pelayo. His friend Polo remained rather a proponent and did not construct his own anti-Krausian theory, though his vehemence gained him the description of "grande enemigo de la barbarie krausista" (great enemy of Krausist barbarism), especially as Spanish Krausism, initially avoiding direct confrontation with the Church, later assumed a decisively challenging tone. Fiercely advocating Catholic integrity as a basis of public education, he nevertheless recognized the necessity of incorporating elements from the liberal mainstream; some scholars even maintain that Polo was completely integrated in the liberal system of education.

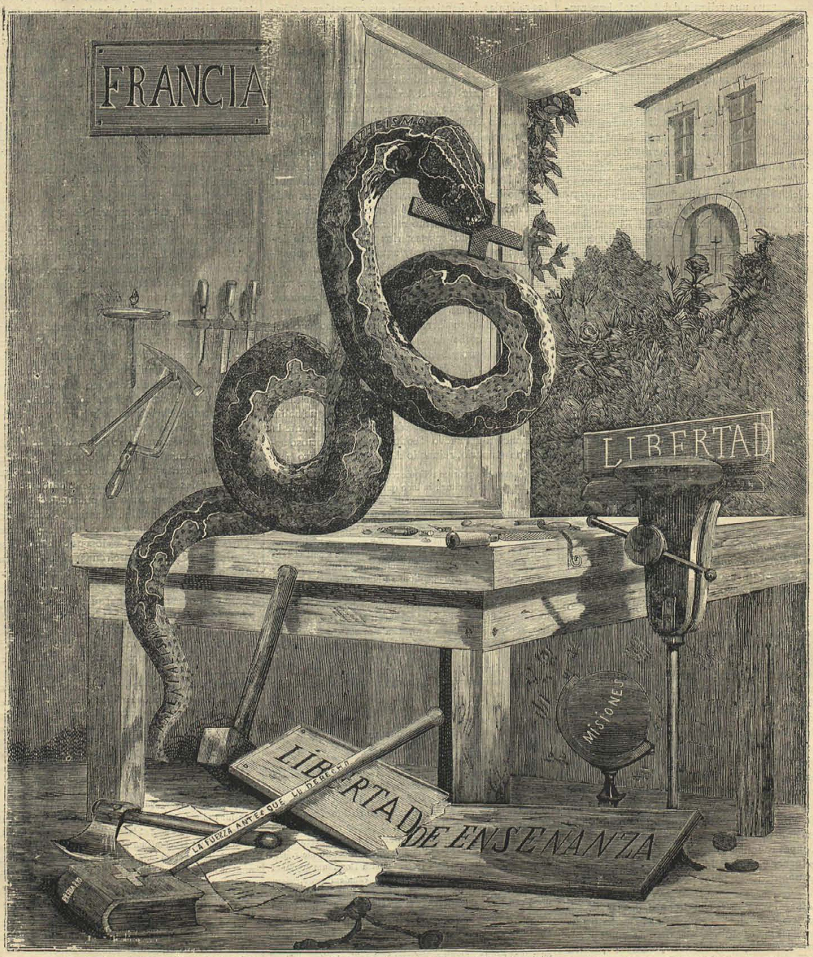
Anti-krausist cartoon, 1881

Another characteristic feature of Polo's outlook was his position towards evolutionism, though opinions on his stance differ. Some view it as an exemplary obscurantist Catholic reaction to scientific progress, dismissed as "involucionismo, integrismo, tradicionalismo e ideario reaccionario" (involutionism, fundamentalism, traditionalism and reactionary ideology.) Some suggest that his neo-Thomism was not an abrupt rejection of advances produced by science, as Polo tried to work out a conciliatory approach. Though his stance on Darwinism is portrayed as "aggressive and intolerant attack", others consider it in line with scientific standards of the era, systematic and posing questions - like those related to hereditary transmission or variability patterns – which remained unanswered until the 1920s. A detailed study suggests that Polo engaged in the discourse not so much to challenge evolutionary theory, but to confront secularism which used it as a ram against the Spanish Catholic outlook.

== Politician ==
Carlist standard

Polo commenced his political career in 1870, speaking at local meetings in Sierra de Albarracín. During the Third Carlist War he supported the insurgents as an ojalatero, placed under police surveillance with most of his property embargoed. Facing restrictions and fearing for his life, he temporarily went into hiding; even following the Carlist defeat in 1876 he was harassed at his workplace in Teruel for a long time.

In the 1880s he contributed to the legitimist cause mostly as a novelist, propagating Carlist virtues of his protagonists, and as a professor, lambasting liberal ideas disseminated by Jews and freemasonry. In 1891 and 1893 he lost campaigns to Cortes and was finally victorious in 1896. In parliament he focused on education, opposing Liberal secularisation plans and promoting local languages in schools. Following defeats in successive elections he resumed his parliamentary career as a senator in 1907, re-elected in 1910 and 1914. In the upper chamber he continued to defend the position of the Catholic Church, especially during the Ley del Candado crisis; he was somewhat acknowledged as a dangerous opponent by procedural gimmicks employed by his adversaries. Lambasting the others for compromising the party line, he himself engaged in secret talks with the conservatives.

In the 1890s Polo emerged among the chief Valencian Carlists. He forged friendly relations with the Marquis of Cerralbo and a number of other national leaders, gradually becoming a pivotal figure. Personally introduced to Carlos VII, in 1901 he was considered a candidate for his personal secretary. Revealing interest in the emerging workers' question he contributed to Acta de Loredan, published the official Carlist program and persuaded the claimant to re-organise the party, uniting the military and civil command chain. Fully aware of the need to modernise Traditionalism, he appreciated the role of efficient party structures, building a dense network.

In 1904 Polo was nominated chief of the Valencian branch. Personally intransigent, he was resented by other Levantine leaders, Manuel Simó Marín and Joaquín Llorens Fernandez. The conflict, fuelled by strong personalities, Polo's adamant leadership style and discrepancies between legitimists and posibilistas, though Carlism is typically viewed as fanatical, in fact it has always been plagued by division between those opting for "malminorismo" and those preferring to "echarse al monte"; Polo tended to side with the latter. His intransigence is credited for preventing the party from amalgamation into Union Católica, Lliga or other collaborative structures. Also on the national scene, bedeviled by intrigues among Carlist pundits, Polo's relations deteriorated, including those with Carlos VII and especially his wife Berthe de Rohan. He considered his resignation handed to the new Carlist king Jaime III a purely procedural gesture, and was shocked to see it accepted, though as a senator he was appointed to national executive, Junta Nacional Tradicionalista, in 1912.

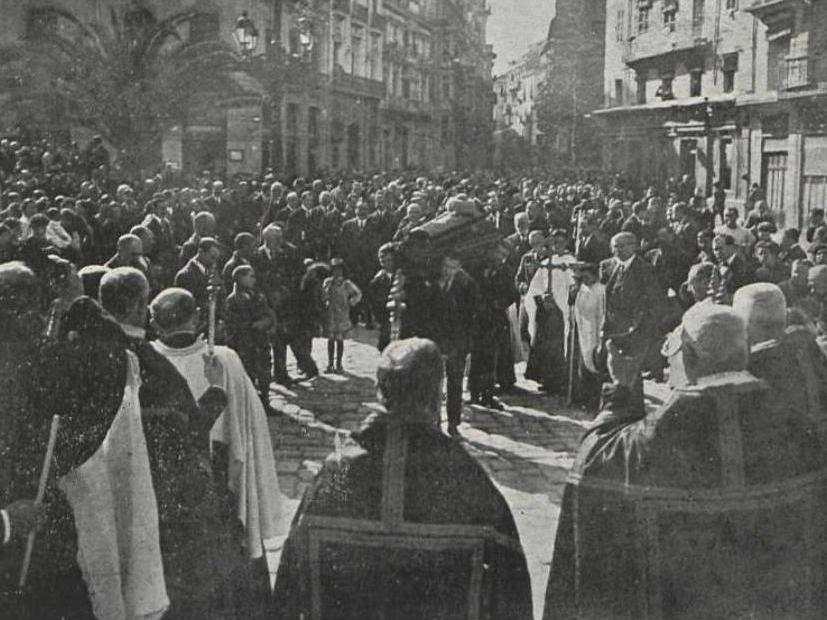
Polo's funeral, Valencia

With no close family, surrounded by books, moths and butterflies, dedicated to completion of his massive memories, personally intolerant and acrimonious, by the end of his life Polo grew into a misanthrope and passed into living memory as a "grumpy old man". He became increasingly pessimistic as to the future of Traditionalism, highly skeptical of its political leaders and the claimant himself. At one point he considered himself close to Integrism, though until his death he remained loyal to the Carlist dynasty.

== Works ==
Carlism and politics

- Ligera exposición doctrinal del credo católico tradicionalista (1892)
- Credo y Programa del Partido Carlista (1905)
- Anarquía fiera y mansa: folleto antiterrorista (1908)
- Memorias políticas (1870-1913)

Catholicism and ethics

- Elementos de ética o filosofía moral (1882)
- León XIII y los católicos españoles (1883)
- Ética elemental (1883)
- Vida de León XIII: extracto de sus principales documentos públicos y relación de sus fiestas jubilares (1888)
- La Madre de Don Carlos. Estudio crítico-biográfico (1906)

Law and science

- Contra Darwin: supuesto parentesco entre el hombre y el mono (1881)
- Elementos de psicología (1889)
- Lógica elemental (1902)
- La enseñanza española ante la ley y el sentido común: cuestiones pedagógicas (1908)
- Rudimentos del derecho (1911)

Novels and tales

- Costumbres populares de la Sierra de Albarracín: cuentos originales (1876)
- Los Mayos: novela original de costumbres populares de la Sierra de Albarracín (1879)
- Sacramento y concubinato: novela de costumbres contemporáneas (1884)
- Quien mal anda, ¿cómo acaba? (1890)
- Manojico de cuentos (1895)
- Pepinillos en vinagre (1891)
- El guerrillero: novela tejida con retazos de la historia militar carlista (1906)

== See also ==
- Carlism
- Electoral Carlism (Restoration)
- Literary realism
