= Pedomicrobium ferrugineum =

Scientific classification
- Domain: Bacteria
- Kingdom: Pseudomonadati
- Phylum: Pseudomonadota
- Class: Alphaproteobacteria
- Order: Hyphomicrobiales
- Family: Hyphomicrobiaceae
- Genus: Pedomicrobium
- Species: P. ferrugineum

Binomial name
- Pedomicrobium ferrugineum Aristovskaya 1961

Type strain
- ATCC 33119, DSM 1540, IFAM S-1290, S-122

Species of bacterium

Pedomicrobium ferrugineum is a rod-shaped, aerobic to microaerophillic bacterium from the genus of Pedomicrobium with one polar or supolar flagellum. Pedomicrobium ferrugineum has been isolated from podzolic soil in north Germany
