= Dichotomicrobium thermohalophilum =

Scientific classification
- Domain: Bacteria
- Kingdom: Pseudomonadati
- Phylum: Pseudomonadota
- Class: Alphaproteobacteria
- Order: Hyphomicrobiales
- Family: Hyphomicrobiaceae
- Genus: Dichotomicrobium
- Species: D. thermohalophilum

Binomial name
- Dichotomicrobium thermohalophilum Hirsch and Hoffman 1989

Species of bacterium

Dichotomicrobium thermohalophilum is a bacterium from the genus of Dichotomicrobium which was isolated from a solar lake in Elat in Israel.
