= Pedomicrobium manganicum =

Scientific classification
- Domain: Bacteria
- Kingdom: Pseudomonadati
- Phylum: Pseudomonadota
- Class: Alphaproteobacteria
- Order: Hyphomicrobiales
- Family: Hyphomicrobiaceae
- Genus: Pedomicrobium
- Species: P. manganicum

Binomial name
- Pedomicrobium manganicum Aristovskaya 1961

Type strain
- ATCC 3121, ATCC 33121, DSM 1545, E-211, IFAM E-1129

Species of bacterium

Pedomicrobium manganicum is a bacterium from the genus of Pedomicrobium which was isolated from quartzite rock pool in France. Pedomicrobium manganicum has the ability to bind MnO_{2}
