= Hyphomicrobium chloromethanicum =

Scientific classification
- Domain: Bacteria
- Kingdom: Pseudomonadati
- Phylum: Pseudomonadota
- Class: Alphaproteobacteria
- Order: Hyphomicrobiales
- Family: Hyphomicrobiaceae
- Genus: Hyphomicrobium
- Species: H. chloromethanicum

Binomial name
- Hyphomicrobium chloromethanicum McDonald et al. 2001

Type strain
- CM2, NCIMB 13687, VKM B-2176

Species of bacterium

Hyphomicrobium chloromethanicum is an aerobic, methylotrophic bacteria from the genus of Hyphomicrobium which can utilize chloromethane as the only source of carbon.
