= Hyphomicrobium hollandicum =

Scientific classification
- Domain: Bacteria
- Kingdom: Pseudomonadati
- Phylum: Pseudomonadota
- Class: Alphaproteobacteria
- Order: Hyphomicrobiales
- Family: Hyphomicrobiaceae
- Genus: Hyphomicrobium
- Species: H. hollandicum

Binomial name
- Hyphomicrobium hollandicum Hirsch 1989

Type strain
- ATCC 27498, IFAM KB-677, KB-677

Species of bacterium

Hyphomicrobium hollandicum is an aerobic bacteria from the genus of Hyphomicrobium which was isolated from soil in California in the US.
