= Salaberry =

Salaberry is a surname. Notable people with the surname include:

- Hugo Manuel Salaberry Goyeneche (born 1952), Argentine prelate of the Roman Catholic Church
- Charles de Salaberry, CB (1778–1829), Canadian military officer and statesman of the seigneurial class
- Charles-René-Léonidas d'Irumberry de Salaberry (1820–1882), French-Canadian militia officer and civil servant
- Enrique Cahen Salaberry (1911–1991), prolific Argentine film director
- Horacio Salaberry (born 1987), Uruguayan footballer
- Ignace-Michel-Louis-Antoine d'Irumberry de Salaberry (1752–1828), Member of the Legislative Assembly of Lower Canada
- Juan Daniel Salaberry (born 1980), Uruguayan footballer
- Melchior-Alphonse de Salaberry (1813–1867), Canadien lawyer and political figure
- Michel de Salaberry (1704–1768), Basque naval officer and a shipowner who migrated to Quebec
- Rafael Díaz Aguado Salaberry (1870–1942), Spanish Carlist politician
- Zilka Salaberry (1917–2005), Brazilian actress who appeared in many telenovelas

== See also ==
- Salaberry-de-Valleyfield, city in southwestern Quebec
- Rural Municipality of De Salaberry, rural municipality in the province of Manitoba in Western Canada
- Salbari
- Seliberia
- Syllabary
