= Seliberia stellata =

Scientific classification
- Domain: Bacteria
- Kingdom: Pseudomonadati
- Phylum: Pseudomonadota
- Class: Alphaproteobacteria
- Order: Hyphomicrobiales
- Family: Hyphomicrobiaceae
- Genus: Seliberia
- Species: S. stellata

Binomial name
- Seliberia stellata Aristovskaya and Parinkina 1963

Type strain
- B-1340, CECT 7960, IAM 15139, INMI N-9, JCM 21594, VKM B-1340

Species of bacterium

Seliberia stellata is an oligotrophic bacterium from the genus of Seliberia with a flagellum which was isolated from humus-illuvial pozol soil from Karelian Isthmus in Russia.
