= Prosthecomicrobium pneumaticum =

Scientific classification
- Domain: Bacteria
- Kingdom: Pseudomonadati
- Phylum: Pseudomonadota
- Class: Alphaproteobacteria
- Order: Hyphomicrobiales
- Family: Hyphomicrobiaceae
- Genus: Prosthecomicrobium
- Species: P. pneumaticum

Binomial name
- Prosthecomicrobium pneumaticum Staley 1968

Type strain
- ATCC 23633, ATCC 23633, DSM 8972, NCIMB 12774, VKM B-1389

Species of bacterium

Prosthecomicrobium pneumaticum is an aerobic bacterium from the genus of Prosthecomicrobium which has been isolated from freshwater.
