= Salaverry (surname) =

Salaverry is a surname. Notable people with the surname include:

- Daniel Salaverry (born 1972), Peruvian architect and politician
- Felipe Santiago Salaverry (1805–1836), Peruvian soldier and politician
- Ivan Salaverry (born 1971), Canadian mixed martial arts fighter and instructor

== See also ==
- Salaberry
