= Hyphomicrobium aestuarii =

Scientific classification
- Domain: Bacteria
- Kingdom: Pseudomonadati
- Phylum: Pseudomonadota
- Class: Alphaproteobacteria
- Order: Hyphomicrobiales
- Family: Hyphomicrobiaceae
- Genus: Hyphomicrobium
- Species: H. aestuarii

Binomial name
- Hyphomicrobium aestuarii Hirsch 1989

Type strain
- ATCC 27483, IFAM NQ-521 GR, IFAM NQ-521Gr, KCTC 12269, NCIMB 11052, NQ-521 GR, NQ-521-Gr

Species of bacterium

Hyphomicrobium aestuarii is a Gram-negative bacteria from the genus of Hyphomicrobium.
