= Hyphomicrobium nitrativorans =

Scientific classification
- Domain: Bacteria
- Kingdom: Pseudomonadati
- Phylum: Pseudomonadota
- Class: Alphaproteobacteria
- Order: Hyphomicrobiales
- Family: Hyphomicrobiaceae
- Genus: Hyphomicrobium
- Species: H. nitrativorans

Binomial name
- Hyphomicrobium nitrativorans Martineau et al. 2013

Type strain
- ATCC BAA-2476, LMG 27277, NL23

Species of bacterium

Hyphomicrobium nitrativorans is a bacterium from the genus of Hyphomicrobium which was isolated from biofilm at the Montreal Biodome in Canada.
