= Pedomicrobium australicum =

Scientific classification
- Domain: Bacteria
- Kingdom: Pseudomonadati
- Phylum: Pseudomonadota
- Class: Alphaproteobacteria
- Order: Hyphomicrobiales
- Family: Hyphomicrobiaceae
- Genus: Pedomicrobium
- Species: P. australicum

Binomial name
- Pedomicrobium australicum Gebers and Beese 1988

Type strain
- ATCC 43611, IFAM ST1306

Pedomicrobium australicum is a bacterium from the genus of Pedomicrobium.
