= Filomicrobium fusiforme =

Scientific classification
- Domain: Bacteria
- Kingdom: Pseudomonadati
- Phylum: Pseudomonadota
- Class: Alphaproteobacteria
- Order: Hyphomicrobiales
- Family: Hyphomicrobiaceae
- Genus: Filomicrobium
- Species: F. fusiforme

Binomial name
- Filomicrobium fusiforme Schlesner 1988

Type strain
- ATCC 35158, DSM 5304, IFAM 1315, St 128

Synonyms
- Pedomicrobium fusiforme

Species of bacterium

Filomicrobium fusiforme is a Gram-negative, aerobic, motile bacteria from the genus Filomicrobium which was isolated from brackish water in Germany.
