= Hyphomicrobium zavarzinii =

Scientific classification
- Domain: Bacteria
- Kingdom: Pseudomonadati
- Phylum: Pseudomonadota
- Class: Alphaproteobacteria
- Order: Hyphomicrobiales
- Family: Hyphomicrobiaceae
- Genus: Hyphomicrobium
- Species: H. zavarzinii

Binomial name
- Hyphomicrobium zavarzinii Hirsch 1989

Type strain
- ATCC 27496, DSM 1566, IFAM ZV-622, VKM B-2174, ZV-622

Species of bacterium

Hyphomicrobium zavarzinii is a bacterium from the genus of Hyphomicrobium which was isolated from swampy soil in Moscow in Russia.
