= Pedomicrobium americanum =

Scientific classification
- Domain: Bacteria
- Kingdom: Pseudomonadati
- Phylum: Pseudomonadota
- Class: Alphaproteobacteria
- Order: Hyphomicrobiales
- Family: Hyphomicrobiaceae
- Genus: Pedomicrobium
- Species: P. americanum

Binomial name
- Pedomicrobium americanum Gebers and Beese 1988

Type strain
- ATCC 43612, IFAM G-1381

Species of bacterium

Pedomicrobium americanum is a bacterium from the genus of Pedomicrobium which has been isolated from freshwater in New York in the United States.
