= Glycerate 2-kinase =

Type of enzyme

Identifiers
- EC no.: 2.7.1.165

Databases
- IntEnz: IntEnz view
- BRENDA: BRENDA entry
- ExPASy: NiceZyme view
- KEGG: KEGG entry
- MetaCyc: metabolic pathway
- PRIAM: profile
- PDB structures: RCSB PDB PDBe PDBsum
Search
- PMC: articles
- PubMed: articles
- NCBI: proteins

Glycerate 2-kinase (EC 2.7.1.165, D-glycerate-2-kinase, glycerate kinase (2-phosphoglycerate forming), ATP:(R)-glycerate 2-phosphotransferase) is an enzyme with systematic name ATP:D-glycerate 2-phosphotransferase. It catalyses the following chemical reaction

ATP +
D-glyceric acid
ADP +
2-phospho-D-glyceric acid

The enzyme first characterised from Hyphomicrobium methylovorum converts D-glyceric acid to 2-phospho-D-glyceric acid by transferring a phosphate group from the cofactor, adenosine triphosphate (ATP), which is converted to adenosine diphosphate (ADP). It has been found in many other organisms, including Escherichia coli, Thermoplasma acidophilum, Pyrococcus horikoshii,, Picrophilus torridus, and Sulfolobus tokodaii.

Glycerate 2-kinase is a key enzyme in the nonphosphorylative Entner-Doudoroff pathway in archaea.
