= Hyphomicrobium denitrificans =

Scientific classification
- Domain: Bacteria
- Kingdom: Pseudomonadati
- Phylum: Pseudomonadota
- Class: Alphaproteobacteria
- Order: Hyphomicrobiales
- Family: Hyphomicrobiaceae
- Genus: Hyphomicrobium
- Species: H. denitrificans

Binomial name
- Hyphomicrobium denitrificans Urakami et al. 1995

Type strain
- ATCC 51888, DSM 1869, NCIB 11706, NCIMB 11706, TK 0415

Species of bacterium

Hyphomicrobium denitrificans is a bacterium from the genus of Hyphomicrobium which was isolated from the Netherlands.
