= Hyphomicrobium coagulans =

Scientific classification
- Domain: Bacteria
- Kingdom: Pseudomonadati
- Phylum: Pseudomonadota
- Class: Alphaproteobacteria
- Order: Hyphomicrobiales
- Family: Hyphomicrobiaceae
- Genus: Hyphomicrobium
- Species: H. coagulans

Binomial name
- Hyphomicrobium coagulans Hirsch 1989

Type strain
- ATCC 51888, DSM 1869, NCIB 11706, TK 0415

Species of bacterium

Hyphomicrobium coagulans is a Gram-negative, non-spore-forming, methylotrophic bacteria from the genus of Hyphomicrobium.
