= Hyphomicrobium facile =

Scientific classification
- Domain: Bacteria
- Kingdom: Pseudomonadati
- Phylum: Pseudomonadota
- Class: Alphaproteobacteria
- Order: Hyphomicrobiales
- Family: Hyphomicrobiaceae
- Genus: Hyphomicrobium
- Species: H. facile

Binomial name
- Hyphomicrobium facile Hirsch 1989

Type strain
- ATCC 27485, DSM 1565, H-526, IFAM H-526, NCIB 10342, NCIMB 10342

Synonyms
- Hyphomicrobium facilis

Species of bacterium

Hyphomicrobium facile is a bacterium from the genus of Hyphomicrobium which was isolated from soil in New Hampshire in the United States.
