= Filomicrobium insigne =

Scientific classification
- Domain: Bacteria
- Kingdom: Pseudomonadati
- Phylum: Pseudomonadota
- Class: Alphaproteobacteria
- Order: Hyphomicrobiales
- Family: Hyphomicrobiaceae
- Genus: Filomicrobium
- Species: F. insigne

Binomial name
- Filomicrobium insigne Wu et al. 2009

Type strain
- CGMCC 1.6497, LMG 23927, SLG5B-19, Wu SLG5B-19

Species of bacterium

Filomicrobium insigne is a Gram-negative, aerobic, motile bacteria from the genus Filomicrobium which was isolated from soil in the coastal Shengli Oilfield in Shandong Province in eastern China.
