= Hyphomicrobium vulgare =

Scientific classification
- Domain: Bacteria
- Kingdom: Pseudomonadati
- Phylum: Pseudomonadota
- Class: Alphaproteobacteria
- Order: Hyphomicrobiales
- Family: Hyphomicrobiaceae
- Genus: Hyphomicrobium
- Species: H. vulgare

Binomial name
- Hyphomicrobium vulgare Stutzer and Hartleb 1899

Type strain
- ATCC 33404, JCM 6889, KCTC 12504, NCIB 9698, NCIMB 9698, NQ-521 B

Species of bacterium

Hyphomicrobium vulgare is a bacterium from the genus of Hyphomicrobium.
