= Hyphomicrobium sulfonivorans =

Scientific classification
- Domain: Bacteria
- Kingdom: Pseudomonadati
- Phylum: Pseudomonadota
- Class: Alphaproteobacteria
- Order: Hyphomicrobiales
- Family: Hyphomicrobiaceae
- Genus: Hyphomicrobium
- Species: H. sulfonivorans

Binomial name
- Hyphomicrobium sulfonivorans Borodina et al. 2002

Type strain
- ATCC BAA-113, DSM 13863, S1

Species of bacterium

Hyphomicrobium sulfonivorans is a bacterium from the genus of Hyphomicrobium which was isolated from garden soil in Warwickshire in England.
