= Prosthecomicrobium hirschii =

Scientific classification
- Domain: Bacteria
- Kingdom: Pseudomonadati
- Phylum: Pseudomonadota
- Class: Alphaproteobacteria
- Order: Hyphomicrobiales
- Family: Hyphomicrobiaceae
- Genus: Prosthecomicrobium
- Species: P. hirschii

Binomial name
- Prosthecomicrobium hirschii Staley 1984

Type strain
- ATCC 27832, DSM 8907

Species of bacterium

Prosthecomicrobium hirschii is a bacterium from the genus of Prosthecomicrobium with a polar or subpolar flagella. Prosthecomicrobium hirschii has been isolated from a muskrat pond in North Carolina in the United States.
