= Rafael Díaz Aguado Salaberry =

Spanish Carlist politician

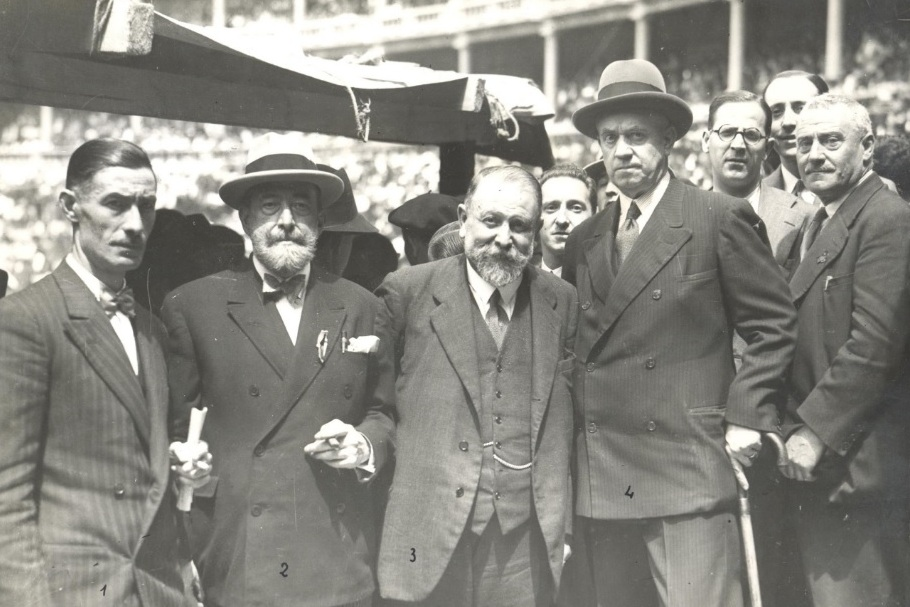
- Born: Rafael Díaz Aguado Salaberry; 1870; Pamplona, Spain
- Died: 1942 (aged 71–72); Madrid, Spain
- Known for: politician
- Political party: Carlism

Rafael Díaz Aguado Salaberry (1870–1942) was a Spanish Carlist politician, active in particular during the final years of the Restoration regime and during the Second Republic. He is best known as deputy to the Cortes during two terms between 1907 and 1914. During the 1936–1939 Civil War he periodically headed the Carlist underground relief organisation Socorro Blanco, which operated as a Francoist fifth column in Republican-held Madrid.

== Family and youth ==
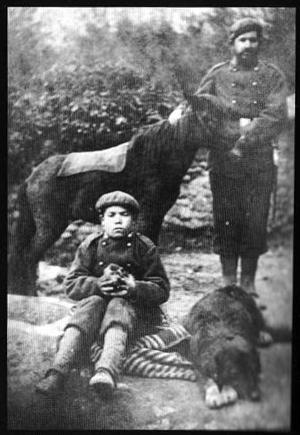
1870s: a Carlist, a boy, a pottok and a dog

The family of Díaz Aguado has been related to Navarre and in the early 19th century many of its males served in army; during the First Carlist War Estebán Díaz Aguado Alonso sided with the Cristinos and gained his name accepting surrender of the Orbaitzeta arms factory; until the 1860s he commanded the Navarrese artillery corps. The next generation demonstrated opposite preferences and joined the legitimists. One, also an artillery man, declared himself a Carlist "until the last drop of blood". The father of Rafael, Felix Díaz Aguado Pérez (born 1834), served in artillery as well; gained honors and promotions for gallant performance during the war in Morocco in 1858-1860 before in 1867 and already as comandante he joined Carlist conspiracy in the Pamplona garrison. The plot was detected and a rising, planned for July 1868, was thwarted by a pre-emptive strike. Díaz Aguado was of the few who avoided incarceration and managed to flee; following a spell on exile he returned and sought amnesty, yet in 1872 he joined the Carlists again. He was recorded for brave stand in hand-to-hand combat during the battle of Oroquieta, later serving as liaison officer at the Estado Mayor. After the war he settled at unspecified location as a retired officer.

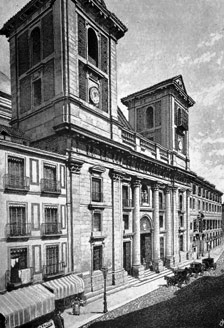
Madrid, late 1880s

Félix Díaz Aguado married Magdalena Salaberry Romeo (died 1906). None of the sources consulted provides any information on her or her family or how many children the couple had. Rafael was born in Pamplona; no detail on his early education is available but some clues point to his schooling in a Piarist college in Archidona. Probably in the late 1880s he moved to Madrid to commence law studies in Universidad Central; he was recorded as enrolled at the Faculty of law between 1891 and 1893. It is not clear whether he graduated; he was later often referred to as "abogado" (lawyer), and it seems that he started to practice as a lawyer in an unidentified location in Gipuzkoa; however, according to one source he did not have the right to practice, and ran into problems because of his fake credentials.

In 1905 and already in Madrid Rafael Díaz Aguado married Auristela Fernández Mesas (died 1956). The couple settled in the capital and had four children, born between 1906 and 1917: Magdalena, Jaime, Rafael and Carlos Díaz-Aguado Fernández. None of them became a public figure, yet at least two sons followed in the footsteps of their father and commenced careers in law: during the Francoist era Jaime served as a judge in Madrid and surroundings, while Carlos performed the same role in the provinces of Logroño, Huesca, Guadalajara, and until the early 1980s in Madrid. Two of Rafael Díaz Aguado Salaberry's grandchildren are academics: Carlos Díaz-Aguado Jalón is a professor of civil law in Universidad del País Vasco, while María José Díaz-Aguado Jalón is a professor at Universidad Complutense de Madrid, with expertise in preventing juvenile violence. The Díaz-Aguado Ros grandchildren are lawyers, one of them active in the Left-wing Podemos party.

== Early public career (1895–1905) ==
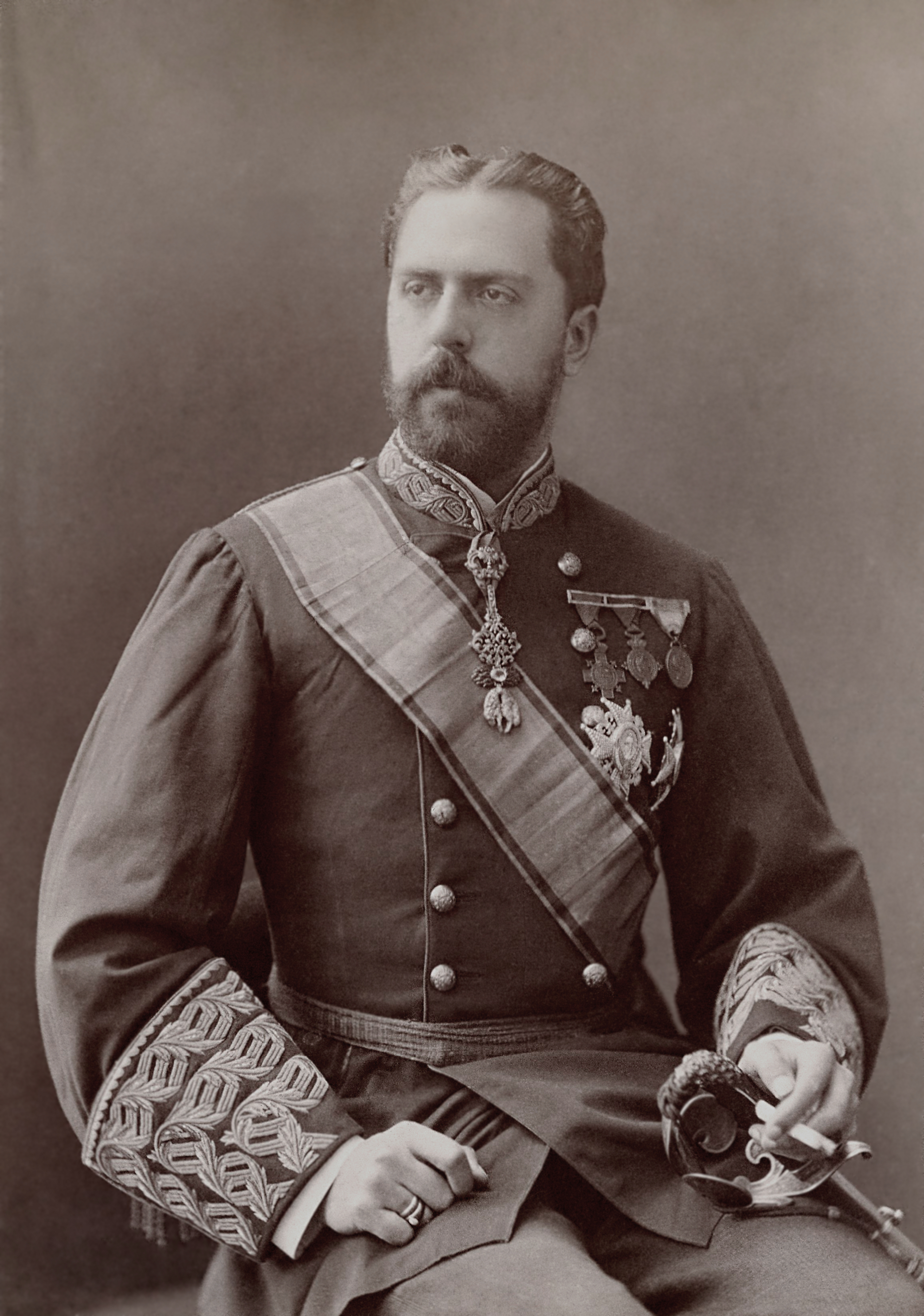
Don Carlos, 1890s

Son of the Carlist officer and combatant, Rafael embraced Traditionalism as part of his family education. However, it is not clear what stand the teenage adopted and whether he followed his father during the crisis which rocked Carlism in 1888. Félix Díaz Aguado concluded that followers of the claimant Don Carlos "persisted in error" and protested against the injustice suffered by Ramón Nocedal, leader of the rebels who soon became secessionists. Though there is no direct confirmation, this might suggest that Felix joined the Nocedalistas and entered their faction of Traditionalism, later to be known as Integrism. It is not clear whether Rafael shared any sympathy for the Integrists and what position he took, especially following his arrival in Madrid and commencement of university education in the early 1890s. Carlist structures in the capital were very much taken over by the Integrists and supporters of Nocedal particularly active in the academic realm, yet there is no evidence that the young Diaz Aguado joined them; there is no evidence of his engagement in orthodox Carlist structures either.

In unclear circumstances of the early 1890s, Díaz Aguado started his co-operation with La Atalaya, a conservative Santander newspaper, listed since 1895 as director of the newspaper. Dring his tenure the Philippine revolution started, with ensuing war; not limiting himself to raising patriotic spirits on newspaper pages, Díaz Aguado co-organized the local Junta de Socorro, set up to assist the Spanish soldiers wounded in the archipelago. However, as public personality he did not escape controversies and in 1897 he was challenged to a duel. The managing board dismissed Díaz Aguado after he allowed publication of a letter which sided with a Liberal contender to the Cortes against a Conservative one; in early 1898 he was called an ex-director.

Carlist standard

Díaz Aguado returned to Madrid; it is not clear what he did for a living, but in the early 20th century he was referred to as "abogado". He started to gain name in religious quasi-political activities. Noted in Congregación y Circulo de San Luis Gonzaga, a conservative cultural outpost, he was also busy co-organizing massive pilgrimage to Rome and took part in Catholic congresses in Burgos in 1899 and in Santiago in 1902. He must have been already active in Carlist structures, as in 1904 he emerged as president of Juventud Tradicionalista and vice-president of Junta Directiva of the Madrid Círculo Tradicionalista. Díaz Aguado started to gain recognition as an orator and militant discussant. Reportedly it was thanks to his belligerent harangues that politicians like Salmerón demanded that Círculo San Gonzaga be closed as a centre of subversive propaganda; in discussion centers like the Madrid Ateneo he clashed with Liberal speakers and personalities like Canalejas recognized him as leader of "juventud reaccionaria, pero animosa, vibrante y con fe en un ideal". In 1905 Díaz Aguado was first noted as engaged in Carlist propaganda activities beyond Madrid, e.g. co-opening a municipal party círculo in Zaragoza.

== Political climax (1905–1914) ==
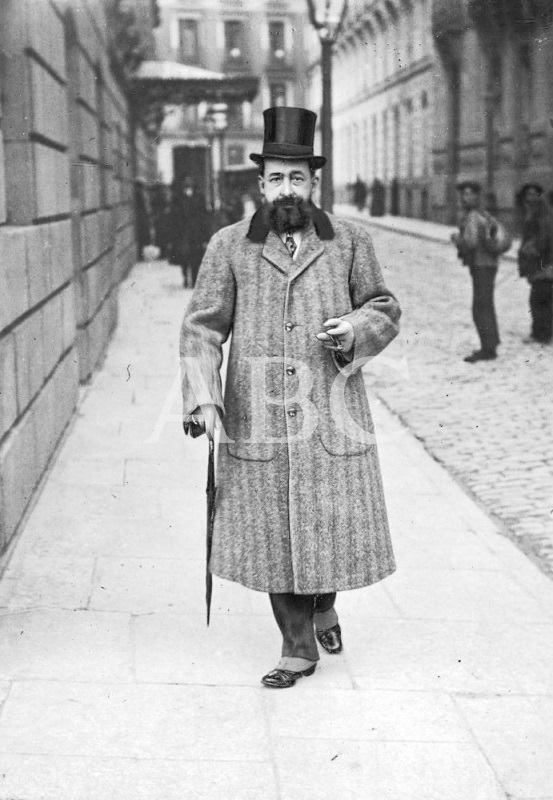
as deputy, 1912

In the 1905 electoral campaign to the Cortes, Díaz Aguado stood as a joint Carlist and Liga Catolica candidate in Valencia, the city he had nothing in common with. The party enjoyed some popularity in the region but remained internally divided and its local jefe, Manuel Polo y Peyrolón, opted rather for the senate. Following a brief campaign Díaz Aguado lost to the increasingly popular writer and militant republican Vicente Blasco Ibáñez; his final result is not known, yet partial data suggests he was not far behind the front-runner. The defeat did not adversely affect his party career, as in the following months he remained active during various feasts across the country and was even elected as honorary president – with party pundits including Vázquez de Mella and Polo y Peyrolón – of various provincial Carlist organizations.

Prior to the 1907 elections, Díaz Aguado was initially rumored to stand in Oviedo but he eventually fielded his candidature in the Gipuzkoan Tolosa, a district which remained a Carlist fiefdom and where a Carlist candidate was almost guaranteed success. Circumstances of his appointment are not clear and were probably related to the fact that previous Carlist deputy from the district, Julio Urquijo, unexpectedly decided not to run. Indeed, the campaign proved an easy triumph and Díaz Aguado was elected with 3,105 votes out of 3,107 ballots cast. In the subsequent campaign of 1910, he again presented his candidature in Tolosa, where this time no-one dared to challenge the Carlist contender; he was declared victorious with no voting taking place and according to the notorious Article 29 of the electoral legislation. It is not clear why he did not run in Tolosa in the campaign of 1914; perhaps he lost his almost-guaranteed place due to electoral haggling between the Carlists, the Integrists and other parties. He was supposed to stand in Seville, but shortly prior to election date he withdrew, never to resume his parliamentarian career again.

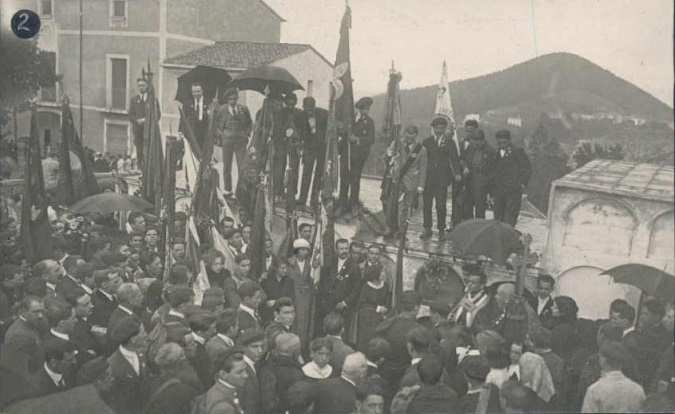
Carlist rural feast, 1910s

The Cortes career or 1907-1914 marked Díaz Aguado's political climax. As the Carlist contingent remained a minoritarian if not marginal faction in the diet his room for maneuvering was limited, yet he used to take the floor willingly, allegedly recognized as an eloquent and cultivated debater. Some of his motions – even if pertaining to marginal issues and eventually defeated – took days to discuss. The political agenda of Díaz Aguado did not differ from the standard Carlist program: he opposed centralization efforts and championed separate local establishments or confronted secularization drive and espoused the Church, though was involved also in other issues like development of credit and insurance. He reached top echelons in the party structures; apart from touring the country and speaking at various rallies, in the early 1910s he was nominated to Junta Superior Central, the nationwide Carlist political executive. He achieved recognized public standing, as Liberal press bothered to mock him in dedicated articles.

== Disengagement and re-engagement (1915–1930) ==
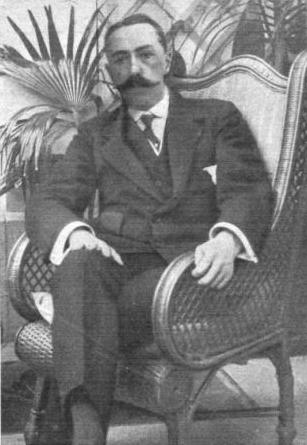
Don Jaime, 1918

It seems that in the late 1910s, during mounting conflict between the new claimant Don Jaime and key party theorist Juan Vázquez de Mella, Díaz Aguado did not take sides. It was especially so as he lost seat in the party executive, which consisted of MPs and regional leaders only. He was occasionally noted as taking part in Carlist feasts, though no longer after 1915. None of the works which discuss internal strife within the movement mentions his name. Instead he was noted as engaged in initiatives flavored with conservatism yet not clearly defined politically, e.g. in a 1916 Catholic syndicalist rally organized by El Debate. When in early 1919 the conflict between de Mella and Don Jaime exploded Díaz Aguado was not listed as a protagonist. One source claims that he distanced himself from the breakaway Mellistas, which is not necessarily tantamount to opting for the orthodox Jaimistas. Most likely he was left politically bewildered; in 1920 he was noted as taking part in a meeting organized by the Ciervistas, an offshoot grouping from disintegrating Conservative Party.

According to one author in the early 1920s Díaz Aguado withdrew from politics; indeed the press did not mention him as engaged in any public activity – be it political, quasi-political, religious or cultural – either during the last years of liberal democracy or during the Primo de Rivera dictatorship era. He remained involved in business, as in the late Restoration period he was engaged in savings and insurance industry; he entered the board of Sociedad de Ahorro y Previsión La Mundial and for a few years featured in its adverts. In the mid-1920s La Mundial grew to one of major insurers on the Spanish market with some 79m pesetas of financial assets, and Díaz Aguado kept holding major though not specified roles within the company. It is not clear whether he practiced as abogado, though it seems he went on with his career in law. In 1925 Díaz Aguado was recorded as prosecutor serving in Audiencia de Alcalá de Henares and was probably related to fighting juvenile crime, as he supervised operations of the local Escuela Industrial de Jovenes Deliquentes.

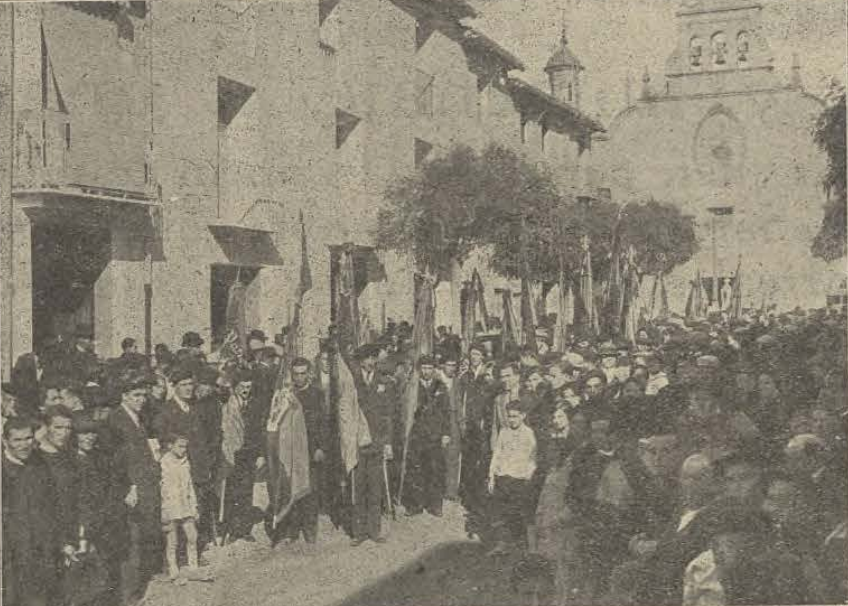
Carlist rural feast, 1930

Díaz Aguado resumed his Carlist activities shortly after the fall of Primo de Rivera, taking advantage of political thaw of the Dictablanda (soft dictatorship). Since early spring of 1930 he started frequenting the Madrid círculo associated with El Cruzado Español and was recorded as one of its more prominent speakers. In the summer and fall his propaganda engagements got increasingly frequent, as he spoke in closed-door meetings and open rallies in Madrid but also in Vascongadas or Catalonia, often seated next to party heavyweights like its Jefé Delegado marqués de Villores. Since campaign prior to local elections gained momentum in early 1931, Díaz Aguado threw himself into monarchist and Right-wing propaganda; as pro-Republican feelings were running high he did not hesitate to pronounce that if indeed a republic was to triumph, it "would be a parenthesis, a meteor, an ephemerical being."

== Republic, war and Francoism (1931–1942) ==
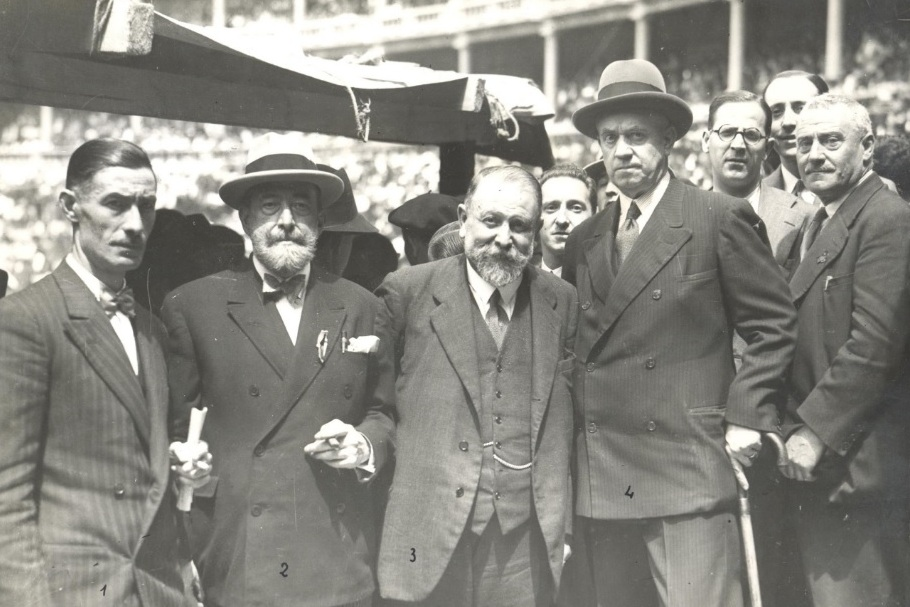
among Carlist politicians, 1931

In 1931 Díaz Aguado was rumored to stand as Jaimista candidate for the Cortes in Álava; scholars say he would have preferred to stand in Vizcaya or Gipuzkoa. However, the Jaimista electoral partners from PNV required candidates running in Vascongadas to be Basques excluding Díaz Aguado, who eventually stood in Valencia and lost miserably. He kept attending Traditionalist rallies as a speaker, touring the country from Navarre to Andalusia. At the turn of 1931 and 1932 he took part in unification of Traditionalist branches in Comunión Tradicionalista and remained its propagandist later on. He did not enter nationwide or Castilian executive structures of the party; instead, he was appointed regional head in Galicia. As representative of Galician Carlism he ran for the Cortes from La Coruña in 1933, losing again. In 1934 Diaz Aguado returned to the Madrid Carlist executive, nominated president of Círculo Tradicionalista in the capital; he brought with himself at least two older sons, as Jaime and Rafael appeared on the party membership rolls. Until 1936 he remained engaged in party propaganda activities from the very North to the very South, and in 1936 was rumored to run for the Cortes from Madrid; it is not clear whether the news was false or whether he withdrew. None of the sources consulted notes whether Díaz Aguado was engaged in Carlist anti-Republican conspiracy.

During the July coup Díaz Aguado was in Madrid and remained trapped in the Republican-held capital; no details are available. He spent the entire Civil War in Madrid, reportedly detained and maltreated by the Republican counter-espionage agency, SIM. The detention might have been related to his role in Socorro Blanco, an underground Carlist relief and mutual assistance organisation active in Republican Madrid; according to later press notes he headed the group after its original leader, Pascual Cebollada, was arrested. Scholarly works dedicated to wartime Madrid do not mention Díaz Aguado as head of Socorro Blanco, though they note some members of the Aguado family engaged in other Fifth Column activities.

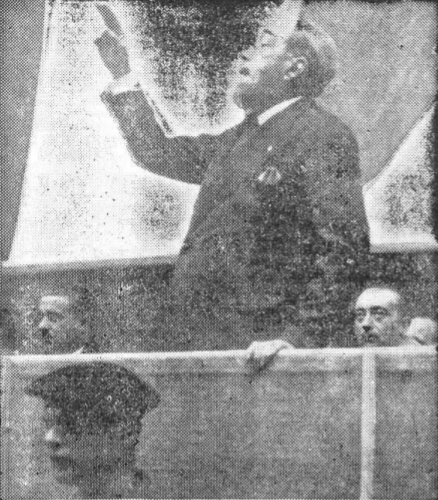
speaking, 1936

Following the Nationalist takeover of the capital in 1939 he was recorded as taking part in homages to the Carlist dead and other funerals. It seems that he briefly resumed his earlier duties in the juridical system and related to fighting juvenile crime, as in the very early 1940s he was nominated inspector nacional del Impuesto of Consejo Superior de Protección de Menores. He resumed Carlist activities and remained loyal to the leadership of Manuel Fal Conde; on his behalf Díaz Aguado used to chair sessions of the Carlist executive, though as honorary president rather than political protagonist. Despite his loyalty to Fal, he seemed somewhat uneasy about the regency of Don Javier and the Borbón-Parmas as would-be Carlist successors to the throne. The funeral of Díaz Aguado turned into a pompous ceremony, attended by minister of justice Esteban de Bilbao Eguía, minister of defense Carlos Asensio Cabanillas (jefe de la casa civil of Franco), and mayor of Madrid Alberto Alcocer y Ribacoba.

== See also ==
- La Atalaya
- Electoral Carlism (Restoration)
- Electoral Carlism (Second Republic)
