= Dichotomicrobium =

Scientific classification
- Domain: Bacteria
- Kingdom: Pseudomonadati
- Phylum: Pseudomonadota
- Class: Alphaproteobacteria
- Order: Hyphomicrobiales
- Family: Hyphomicrobiaceae
- Genus: Dichotomicrobium; Hirsch and Hoffman 1989

Type species
- Dichotomicrobium thermohalophilum

Species
- D. thermohalophilum

Genus of bacteria

Dichotomicrobium is a genus of bacteria from the family of Hyphomicrobiaceae. Currently there is only one species of this genus known (Dichotomicrobium thermohalophilum)
