= Juana Pimentel =

Castilian noblewoman, Countess of Montalban

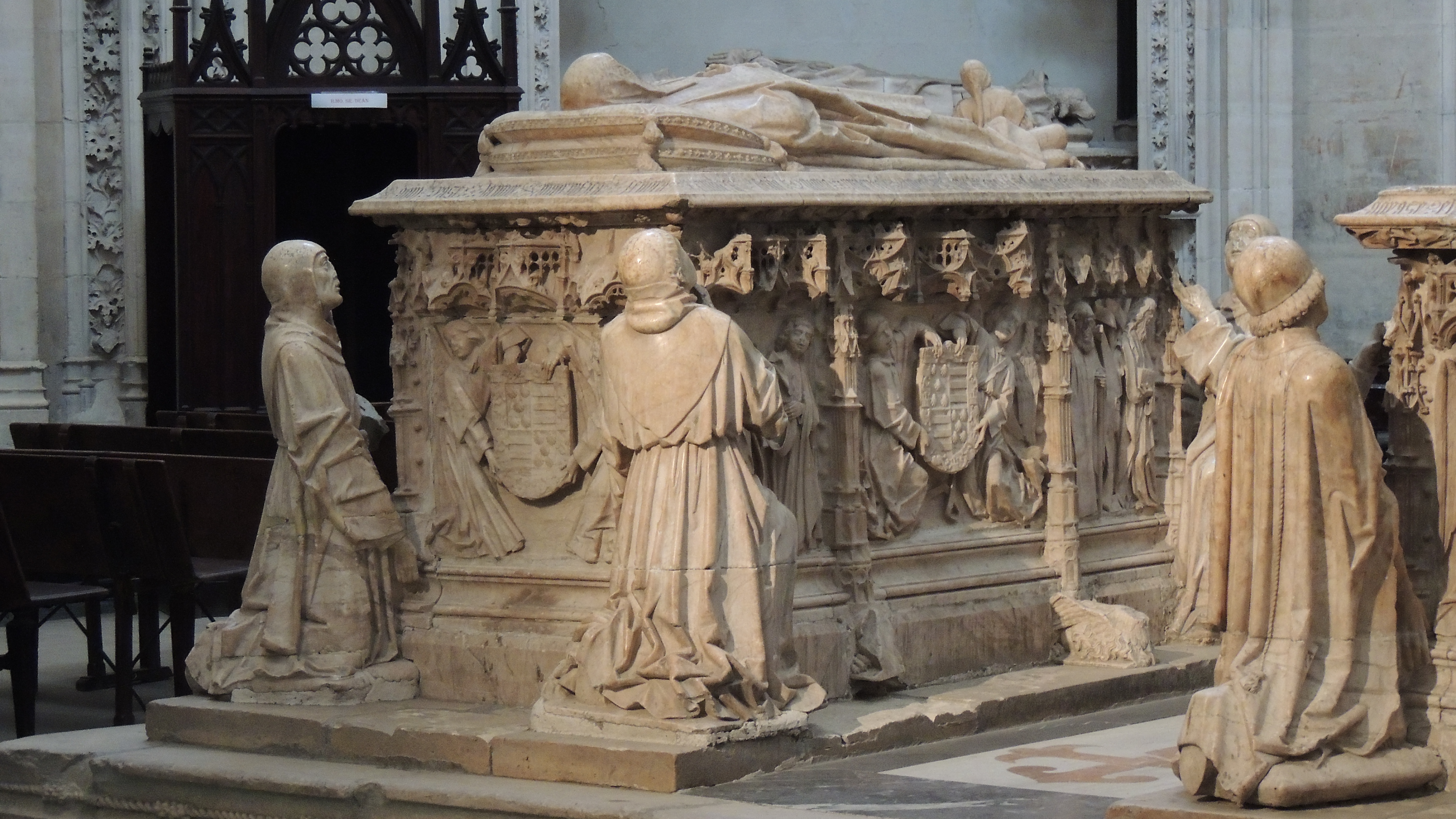
Tomb of Juana Pimentel in the Chapel of St. James in Toledo Cathedral

Juana Pimentel y Enriquez (c. 1404 Guadalajara –6 November 1488) was a Castilian noblewoman, and countess of Montalbán. She was known as "the sad countess".

Her husband was Álvaro de Luna, Constable of Castile.

She has been described as an example of exceptional women leaders of the mediaeval period.

== Sources ==
- Fink De Backer, Stephanie (2004). "Rebel with a Cause: The Marriage of María Pacheco and the Formation of Mendoza Identity". In Nader, Helen (ed.). Power and Gender in Renaissance Spain: Eight Women of the Mendoza Family, 1450-1650. University of Illinois Press. ISBN 0-252-02868-6.
