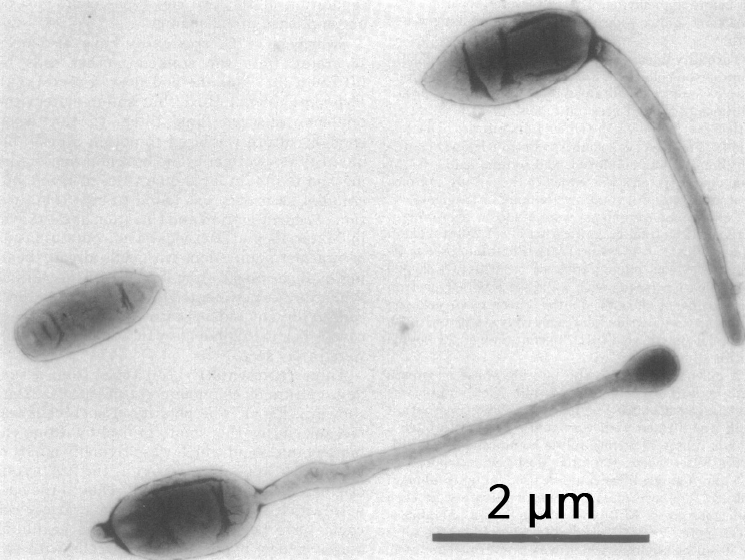

Scientific classification
- Domain: Bacteria
- Kingdom: Pseudomonadati
- Phylum: Pseudomonadota
- Class: Alphaproteobacteria
- Order: Hyphomicrobiales
- Family: Hyphomicrobiaceae
- Genus: Hyphomicrobium; Stutzer and Hartleb 1899

Type species
- Hyphomicrobium vulgare

Species
- H. aestuarii; H. chloromethanicum; H. coagulans; H. denitrificans; H. facile; subsp. facile; subsp. tolerans; subsp. ureaphilum; H. hollandicum; H. methylovorum; H. nitrativorans; H. sulfonivorans; H. vulgare; H. zavarzinii

= Hyphomicrobium =

Genus of bacteria

Hyphomicrobium is a genus of Gram-negative, non-spore-forming, rod-shaped bacteria from the family of Hyphomicrobiaceae. It has a large polar or sub-polar filiform prostheca very similar to that of Caulobacter. In addition to having a nutritional function, the prostheca also plays a role in the initiation of DNA replication.

Reproduction in Hyphomicrobium begins when its hyphal filament (prostheca) grows from one end of the cell (this happens when the cell no longer has a flagellum) and the bud grows from the tip of the prostheca that eventually differentiates into a new swarmer cell.

== Phylogeny ==
The currently accepted taxonomy is based on the List of Prokaryotic names with Standing in Nomenclature (LPSN). The phylogeny is based on whole-genome analysis.

- - Hyphomicrobium
    - - Hyphomicrobium nitrativorans
      - Hyphomicrobium zavarzinii
    - - Hyphomicrobium facile
      - Hyphomicrobium denitrificans
  - outgroup
    Filomicrobium
