= Cañete, Cuenca =

Cañete
- Municipality
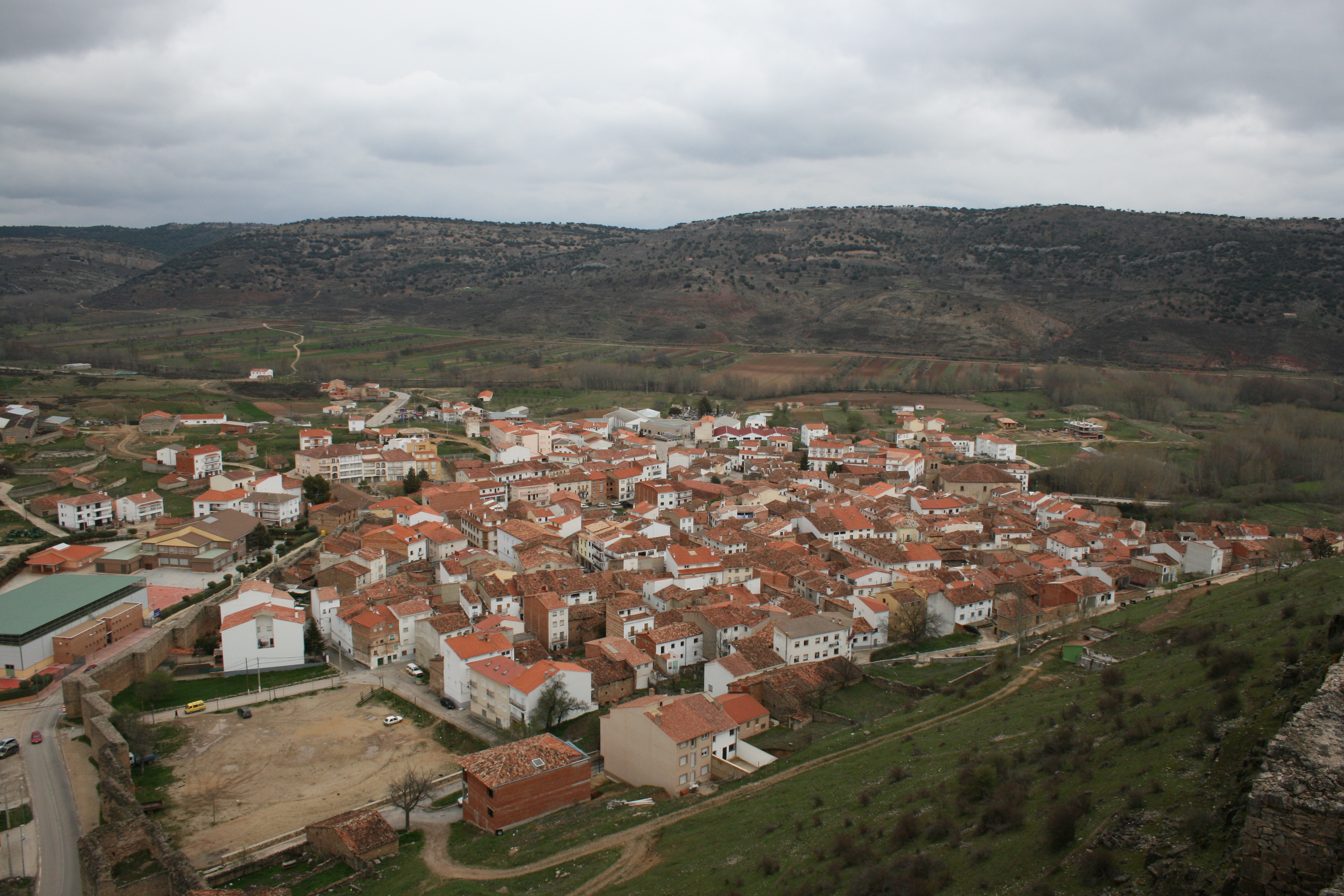

- Coat of arms

- Location in Spain
- Coordinates: 40°03′N 1°39′W
- Country: Spain
- Autonomous community: Castile-La Mancha
- Province: Cuenca
- Comarca: Serrania de Cuenca

Government
  - Mayor: Antonio Asensio Gómez (PSOE)

Area
  - Total: 87.80 km^{2} (33.90 sq mi)
- Elevation: 1,105 m (3,625 ft)

Population (2025-01-01)
  - Total: 877
  - Density: 9.99/km^{2} (25.9/sq mi)
- Demonym: Cañeteros
- Time zone: UTC+1 (CET)
  - Summer (DST): UTC+2 (CEST)
- Postal code: 16300

Cañete (Spanish: [kaˈɲete]) is a municipality in the Cuenca Province, Castile–La Mancha, Spain. It is home to a Moorish-origin castle, and of a line of walls with a gate from the same age.

It is the birthplace of Álvaro de Luna and the origin of the Sephardic Jewish family Canetti (the most famous member of which is Nobel Prize in Literature laureate Elias Canetti); Canetti is a transformation of Cañete, from a time when the family lived in Italy. It is also the birthplace of Manuel Polo y Peyrolón, an ultraconservative philosopher and scholar of clear antisemitic penchant.

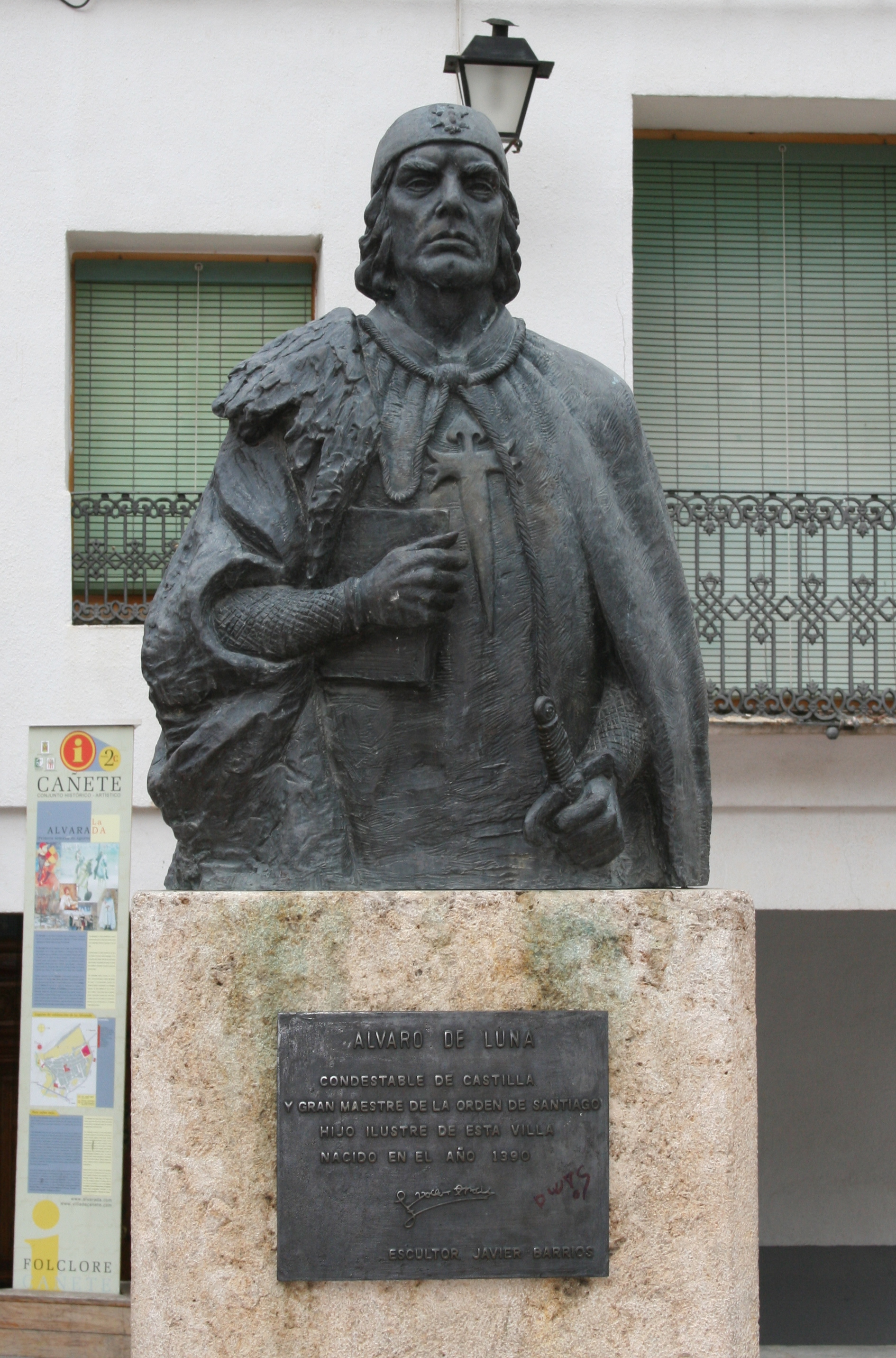
Statue of Álvaro de Luna in Cañete
