= Prosthecomicrobium =

Scientific classification
- Domain: Bacteria
- Kingdom: Pseudomonadati
- Phylum: Pseudomonadota
- Class: Alphaproteobacteria
- Order: Hyphomicrobiales
- Family: Hyphomicrobiaceae
- Genus: Prosthecomicrobium; Staley 1968

Type species
- Prosthecomicrobium pneumaticum

Species
- P. hirschii; P. pneumaticum

Genus of bacteria

Prosthecomicrobium is a genus of aerobic bacteria which was isolated from freshwater samples.
