= Álvaro de Luna =

15th-century Spanish knight and politician

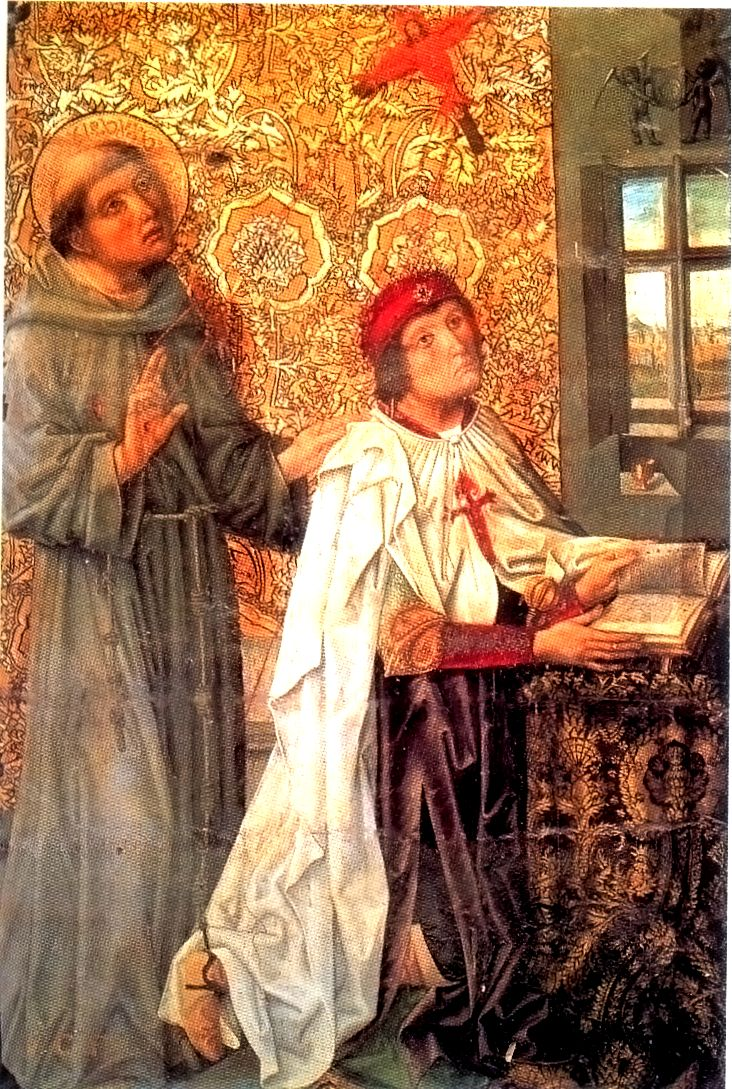
- Álvaro de Luna dressed in the habit of the Order of Santiago

Constable of Castile
- In office 1423–1453
- Preceded by: Ruy López Dávalos
- Succeeded by: Miguel Lucas de Iranzo

Personal details
- Born: Cañete, Crown of Castile
- Died: 2 June 1453 Valladolid, Crown of Castile
- Spouses: Elvira de Portocarrero (m. 1420) Juana Pimentel (m. 1430)

Álvaro de Luna y Fernández de Jarava (between 1388 and 1390 – 2 June 1453), was a Castilian statesman, favourite of John II of Castile. He served as Constable of Castile and as Grand Master of the Order of Santiago. He earned great influence in the Crown's affairs in the wake of his support to John II against the so-called Infantes of Aragon. Once he lost the protection of the monarch, he was executed in Valladolid in 1453.

== Early years ==
He was born between 1388 and 1390 in Cañete, in what is now the province of Cuenca, as the illegitimate son of the Castilian noble don Álvaro Martínez de Luna, copero mayor (the page who poured drinks for a nobleman) of King Henry III of Castile, and María Fernández de Jarana, a woman of great character and beauty.

He was introduced to the court as a page by his uncle Pedro V de Luna, Archbishop of Toledo in 1410. Álvaro soon secured a commanding influence over John II, then a boy. During the regency of King John's uncle Ferdinand, which ended in 1412, he was not allowed to be more than a servant. When, however, Ferdinand was elected king of Aragon, and the regency was assumed by the king's mother, Catherine of Lancaster, daughter of John of Gaunt, and granddaughter of King Peter of Castile, Álvaro became a very important person, the so-called "contino", or old friend of the King. (Note: The Crónica del Halconero by Pedro Carrillo de Huete hints a possible homosexual relation between the king and Álvaro de Luna.)

Álvaro de Luna married Elvira de Portocarrero in 1420. They had no issue. In 1430, he married Juana Pimentel, with whom he had two children.

== The King's favourite ==
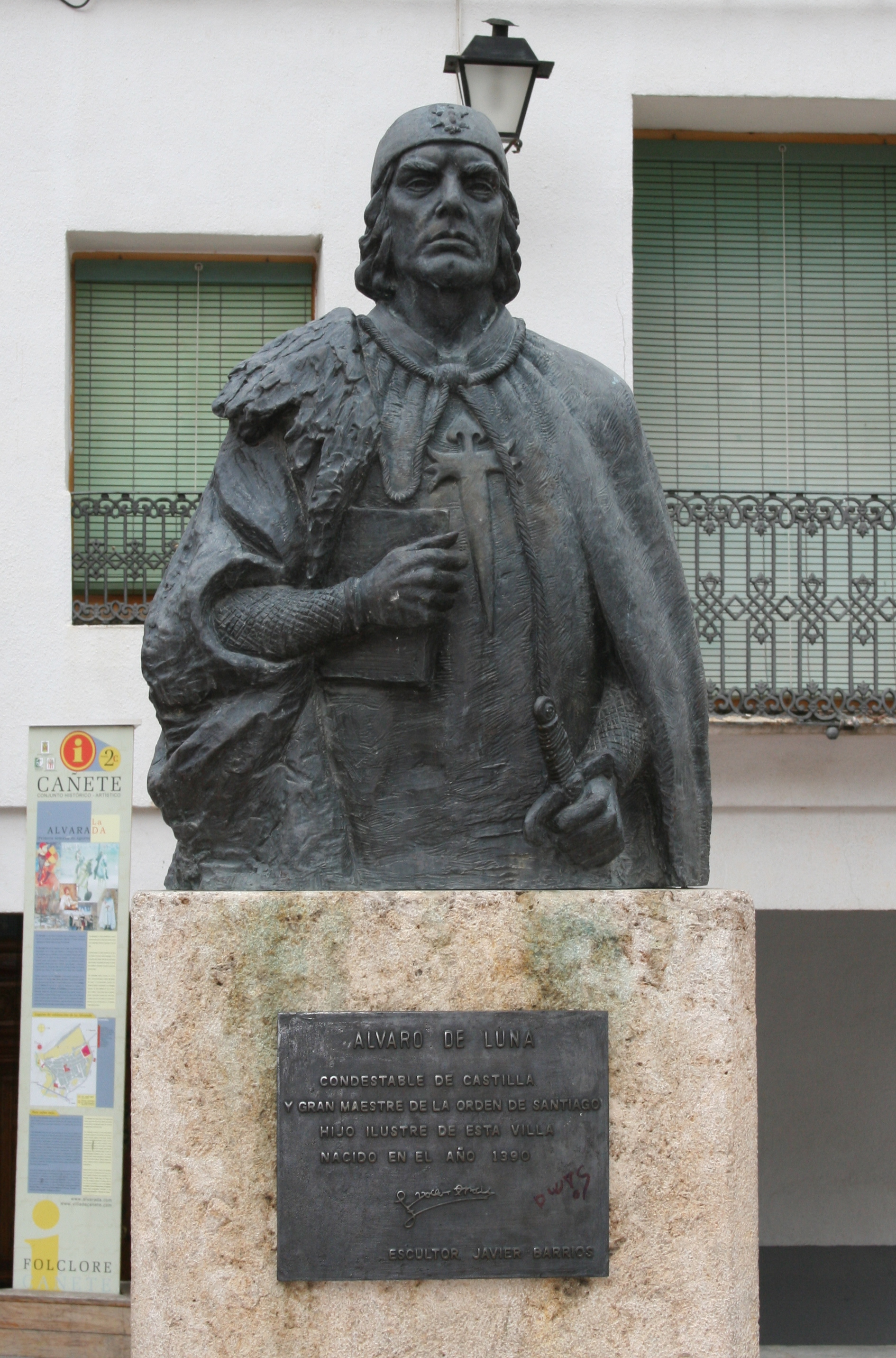
Statue of Álvaro de Luna in Cañete

The young King regarded him with love and affection which the superstition of later time attributed to witchcraft. As the King was under pressure by greedy and unscrupulous nobles – among whom his cousins, the sons of Ferdinand, commonly known as the Infantes of Aragon, his reliance on a favourite who was loyal to him. Luna was also a master of all the accomplishments the King admired: a fine horseman, skillful with a lance and a writer of court verse. But beyond the purview of his peers, he was a master of intrigue and dissimulation.

Until he lost the King's protection, Álvaro was the central figure of the Castilian history of the time. It was a period of constant conflict, characterised by shifting coalitions of nobles, namely the Infantes of Aragon Henry and John of Aragon, brothers of John II's wife Maria, who, under the pretence of freeing the King from the undue influence of his favourite, were intent on making a puppet of him for their own ends.

The part which Álvaro de Luna played has been diversely judged. The Encyclopædia Britannica Eleventh Edition recounts that to Juan de Mariana he appears as a mere self-seeking favourite. To others, he has seemed to be a loyal servant of the King who endeavoured to enforce the authority of the crown, which in Castile was the only alternative to anarchy. He fought for his own ends, but his supremacy was perhaps better than the rule of lawless alliances of plundering nobles.

In 1427, he was solemnly expelled by a coalition of the nobles, only to be recalled in the following year. In 1431, he endeavoured to employ the restless nobles in a campaign for the reconquest of Granada, the remaining territory of Muslim Spain and then ruled by the sultan Muhammed IX. Some successes were gained at the Battle of La Higueruela, but in the end de Luna failed. A consistent policy was impossible with a rebellious aristocracy and a king of indolent character.

In 1445, the faction of nobles allied with Álvaro's main enemies, the Infantes of Aragon, were defeated at the First Battle of Olmedo. One of them, Infante Henry, Duke of Villena, brother of the Queen, died of his wounds. Luna, who had been Constable of Castile and Count of San Esteban de Gormaz since 1423, became Grand Master of the Order of Santiago by election of the Knights.

== Downfall ==
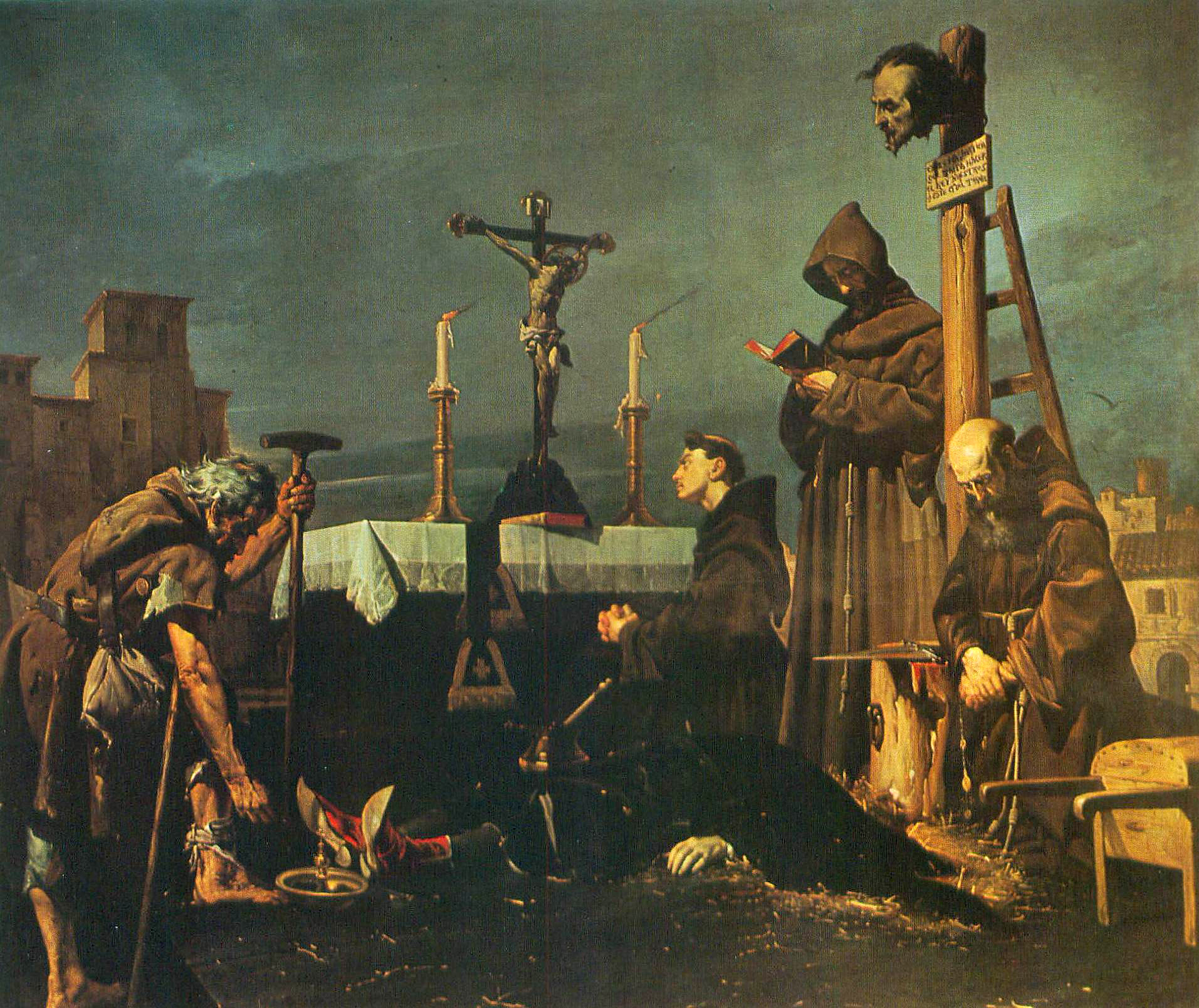
Sad end of Don Álvaro de Luna. Painting by José María Rodríguez de Losada (1826–1896)

Queen Maria died under suspicious circumstances, pointing to Luna as the mastermind. Nevertheless, his power appeared to be thoroughly established. It was, however, based only on the personal affection of the King. The King's second wife, Isabella of Portugal, although her whole royal marriage was a product of Luna's arrangements, was soon offended by the immense influence of the Constable, and when the murder of the King's accountant Alfonso Pérez de Vivero was suspected to have been at Luna's orders, she urged her husband to free himself from thralldom to his favourite. In 1453, the King succumbed to his wife's demands; Luna was arrested, tried and condemned to death, and soon executed by beheading at Valladolid on 2 June 1453.

== Marriage and issue ==
By his marriage with Juana Pimentel, Álvaro de Luna had two children:

- Juan de Luna y Pimentel; married Leonor de Zuniga y Lara, daughter of the Duke of Béjar.
- María de Luna y Pimentel, the heiress after her brother's premature death. She married Íñigo López de Mendoza y Luna, 2nd Duke of the Infantado.

By Margarita Manuel, Álvaro de Luna had a natural son:

- Pedro de Luna y Manuel. He was eventually legitimised.

== See also ==
- Castilian Civil War of 1437–1445

Spanish nobility
New title	Count of San Esteban de Gormaz; 1423–1445	Succeeded by Juan de Luna
Honorary titles
Preceded by Henry of Aragon	Grand Master of the Order of Santiago; 1445–1453	Succeeded by John II of Castile
Political offices
Preceded by Ruy López Dávalos	Constable of Castile; 1423–1453	Succeeded by Miguel Lucas de Iranzo
