= Hyphomicrobium methylovorum =

Scientific classification
- Domain: Bacteria
- Kingdom: Pseudomonadati
- Phylum: Pseudomonadota
- Class: Alphaproteobacteria
- Order: Hyphomicrobiales
- Family: Hyphomicrobiaceae
- Genus: Hyphomicrobium
- Species: H. methylovorum

Binomial name
- Hyphomicrobium methylovorum Izumi et al. 1983

Type strain
- ATCC 35216, BCRC 15013, CCRC 15013, DSM 5458, IFO 14180, JCM 6890, KM 146, NBRC 14180

Species of bacterium

Hyphomicrobium methylovorum is a bacterium from the genus of Hyphomicrobium which was isolated from soil samples in Japan.
