= Calomarde, Aragon =

Calomarde, Spain
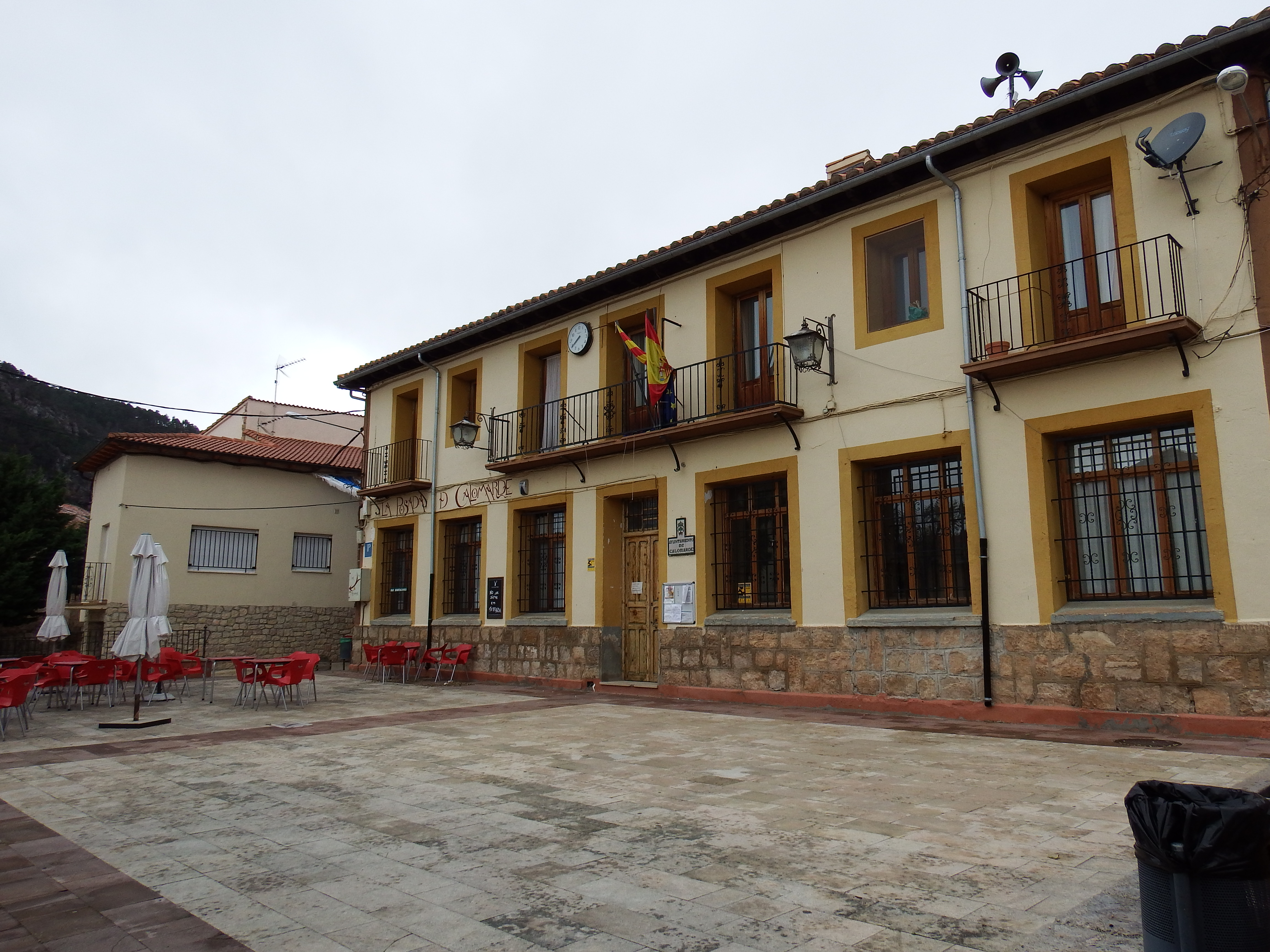
- Town hall

- Flag Coat of arms

- Location within Spain
- Coordinates: 40°22′N 1°34′W
- Country: Spain
- Autonomous community: Aragon
- Province: Teruel
- Municipality: Calomarde

Area
  - Total: 28 km^{2} (11 sq mi)
- Elevation: 1,312 m (4,304 ft)

Population (2025-01-01)
  - Total: 76
- Time zone: UTC+1 (CET)
  - Summer (DST): UTC+2 (CEST)

Calomarde is a municipality located in the province of Teruel, Aragon, Spain. According to the 2005 census (INE), the municipality has a population of 73 inhabitants.

== See also ==
- List of municipalities in Teruel
