= Seliberia =

Scientific classification
- Domain: Bacteria
- Kingdom: Pseudomonadati
- Phylum: Pseudomonadota
- Class: Alphaproteobacteria
- Order: Hyphomicrobiales
- Family: Hyphomicrobiaceae
- Genus: Seliberia; Aristovskaya and Parinkina 1963

Type species
- Seliberia stellata

Species
- S. stellata

Genus of bacteria

Seliberia is a genus of rod-shaped bacteria.
