= Gea de Albarracín =

Gea de Albarracín, Spain
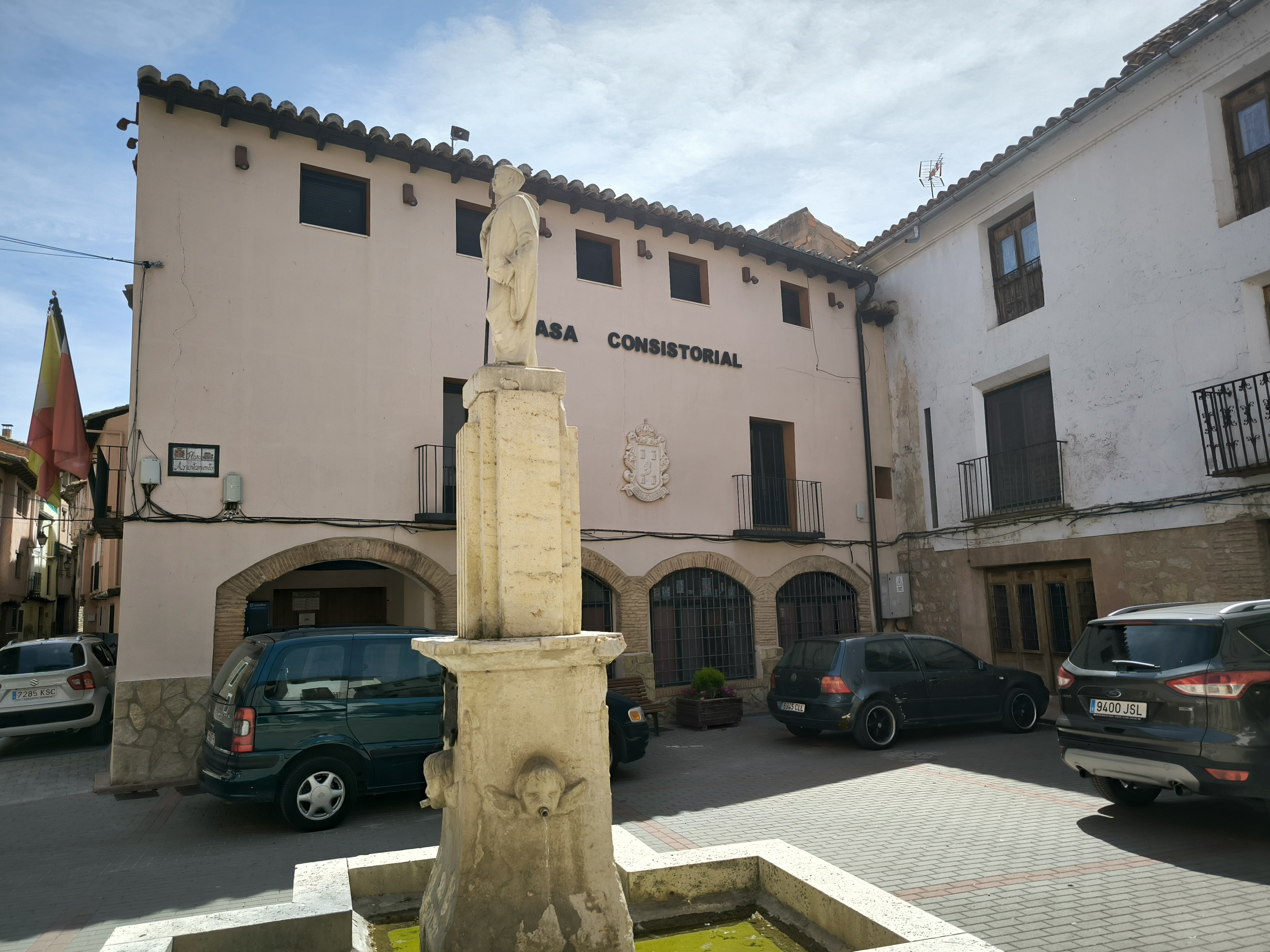
- Town hall

- Flag Coat of arms

- Location within Spain
- Coordinates: 40°25′N 1°21′W
- Country: Spain
- Autonomous community: Aragon
- Province: Teruel
- Municipality: Gea de Albarracín

Area
  - Total: 57.45 km^{2} (22.18 sq mi)
- Elevation: 1,031 m (3,383 ft)

Population (2025-01-01)
  - Total: 459
  - Density: 7.99/km^{2} (20.7/sq mi)
- Time zone: UTC+1 (CET)
  - Summer (DST): UTC+2 (CEST)

Gea de Albarracín is a municipality located in the province of Teruel, Aragon, Spain. According to the 2004 census (INE), the municipality had a population of 434 inhabitants.

== See also ==
- List of municipalities in Teruel
