= Julio Alarcón y Meléndez =

Spanish priest, musician, poet, and writer

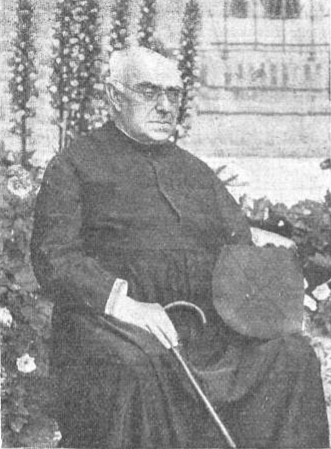

Julio Alarcón y Meléndez (1843–1924) was a Spanish priest, musician, poet and writer.

== List of works ==
- Collection of poems for youth.
- Album of humor, or collection of stories, anecdotes, fables, jokes, dicharachos ... 1865.
- The family album. (1865–1867 ). Literary weekly.
- Loyalty to the test. 1886. The Glass.
- The Azar. 1887 . Drama.
- Guide particular traveler through all known and unknown countries. 1890.
- St. Ignatius of Loyola as Castelar: Humorous refutation of opinions on San Ignacio expressed by Emilio Castelar in religious revolution.
- No inn Andalusian piece. 1892.
- Wild Europe: Explorations into the Social critique of modern civilization of the time.
- Intentions. 1894. Three volumes.
- A young, two feminisms and the aristocracy of heaven, dialogues in verse. 1901.
- Joke and indeed, children's stories. 1901.
- An acceptable feminism. 1902 . Study the work of Concepción Arenal.
- More or less intentional fragments. 1902.
- A great artist, 1910 . Biography Spanish violinist and composer Jesús de Monasterio, which Alarcon was a disciple.
- Memories of memories. 1912 . Collection of poems in two parts: Feelings, his work of 1865 and memories of religious life with a foreword by Angel Maria Barcia.
- The glorifying of the Sacred Heart of Jesus. 1912. Essay on spirit and virtues of Blessed Madeleine Sophie Barat.
- An unknown celebrity. 1914 . Collection of articles previously published in Concepción Arenal magazine Reason and Faith.

== Legacy ==
A street in Cordoba, his hometown, is named "Julio Alarcon" in his honor.
