= Filomicrobium =

Scientific classification
- Domain: Bacteria
- Kingdom: Pseudomonadati
- Phylum: Pseudomonadota
- Class: Alphaproteobacteria
- Order: Hyphomicrobiales
- Family: Hyphomicrobiaceae
- Genus: Filomicrobium; Schlesner 1988

Type species
- Filomicrobium fusiforme Schlesner 1988

Species
- Filomicrobium fusiforme Filomicrobium insigne

Genus of bacteria

Filomicrobium is a genus of bacteria from the family Hyphomicrobiaceae which was first described in 1987 by Schlesner
