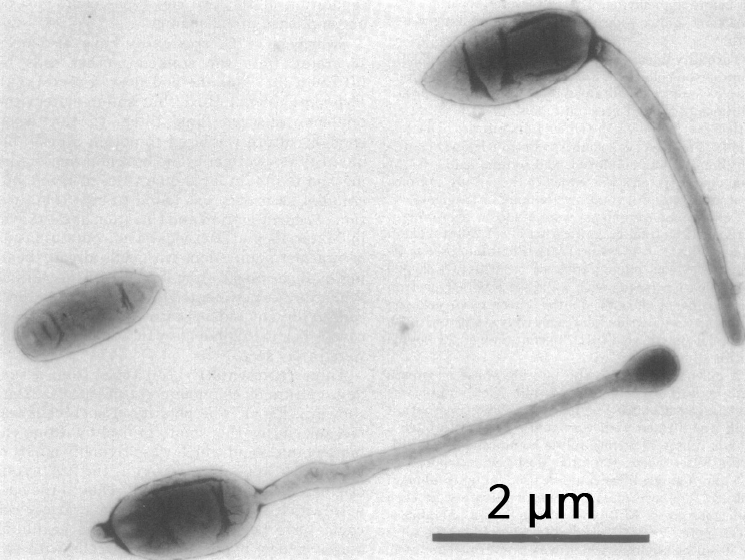
- Three representative cell types of a culture of Hyphomicrobium sp.. Note short processes on two of the three cells, thought to be remnants of the former mother hypha

Scientific classification
- Domain: Bacteria
- Kingdom: Pseudomonadati
- Phylum: Pseudomonadota
- Class: Alphaproteobacteria
- Order: Hyphomicrobiales
- Family: Hyphomicrobiaceae; Babudieri 1950

Genera
- Caenibius Hördt et al. 2020; Dichotomicrobium Hirsch and Hoffmann 1989; Filomicrobium Schlesner 1988; Hyphomicrobium Stutzer and Hartleb 1899 (Approved Lists 1980); Limoniibacter Li et al. 2019; Methyloceanibacter Takeuchi et al. 2014; Methyloligella Doronina et al. 2014; Pedomicrobium Aristovskaya 1961 (Approved Lists 1980); Prosthecomicrobium Staley 1968 (Approved Lists 1980); Rhodomicrobium Duchow and Douglas 1949 (Approved Lists 1980); Seliberia Aristovskaya and Parinkina 1963 (Approved Lists 1980)

Synonyms
- "Methyloligellaceae" Yarza et al. 2014; "Rhodomicrobiaceae" Yarza et al. 2014

= Hyphomicrobiaceae =

Family of bacteria

The Hyphomicrobiaceae are a family of bacteria. Among others, they include Rhodomicrobium, a genus of purple bacteria.

== Phylogeny ==
The currently accepted taxonomy is based on the List of Prokaryotic names with Standing in Nomenclature (LPSN). The phylogeny is based on whole-genome analysis.

- - Hyphomicrobiaceae
    - - Dichotomicrobium
      - Rhodomicrobium
    - - - Methyloligella
        - Methyloceanibacter
      - - Filomicrobium
        - Pedomicrobium
  - outgroup
    Parvibaculaceae
