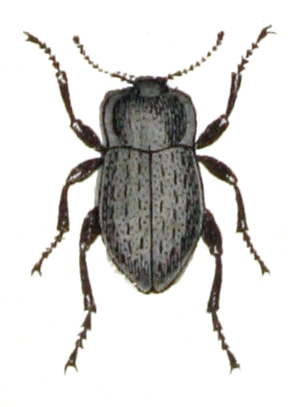
- Asida grisea

Scientific classification
- Kingdom: Animalia
- Phylum: Arthropoda
- Class: Insecta
- Order: Coleoptera
- Suborder: Polyphaga
- Infraorder: Cucujiformia
- Family: Tenebrionidae
- Subfamily: Pimeliinae
- Tribe: Asidini
- Genus: Asida; Latreille, 1802 or 1804

Subgenera
- Asida (Asida); Asida (Euryasida); Asida (Globasida); Asida (Globasida); Asida (Gracilasida); Asida (Granulasida); Asida (Insulasida); Asida (Peltasida); Asida (Planasida); Asida (Polasida); Asida (Pseudoplanasida); Asida (Rugasida)

= Asida (beetle) =

Genus of beetles in western Europe

Asida is a large genus of darkling beetles. They have been located around western Europe, in particular near the Mediterranean Sea.

== Subgenera ==
The genus is divided up into 12 subgenera which in turn contain a large number of species. There are also some species not yet specified to a subgenus.

== Split genera ==
An earlier version of this page claim the following as subgenera: Asida, Aaidopsis, Alphasida, Asida (subgenus), Dolichasida, Elongasida, Euryasida, Glabrasida, Globasida, Globasidd, Gracilasida, Granulasida, Insulasida, Leptasida, Opatrasida, Pelecyphorus, Peltasida, Planasida, Polasida, Pseudoplanasida, Rugasida, Steihasida, Trachasida.

Of these:

- Alphasida is its own full genera and Alphasida (Elongasida), Alphasida (Glabrasida) are two of its subgenera.
