= List of Stenomorpha species =

These species belong to Stenomorpha, a genus of darkling beetles in the family Tenebrionidae.

== Stenomorpha species ==
- Stenomorpha abbreviata (Casey, 1912)
- Stenomorpha abstrusa (Casey, 1912)
- Stenomorpha acerba (Horn, 1878)
- Stenomorpha advena (Casey, 1912)
- Stenomorpha amplicollis (Casey, 1912)
- Stenomorpha angulata (LeConte, 1851)
- Stenomorpha baroni (Casey, 1912)
- Stenomorpha blanda (Champion, 1884)
- Stenomorpha blapsoides Solier, 1836
- Stenomorpha brevimargo (Casey, 1912)
- Stenomorpha californica (Motschulsky, 1870)
- Stenomorpha caliginosa (Casey, 1912)
- Stenomorpha captiosa (Horn, 1870)
- Stenomorpha catalinae (Blaisdell, 1933)
- Stenomorpha clarissae Wilke, 1922
- Stenomorpha clathrata (Champion, 1884)
- Stenomorpha cochisensis (Casey, 1912)
- Stenomorpha coenosa (Casey, 1912)
- Stenomorpha collaris (Champion, 1892)
- Stenomorpha collega (Casey, 1912)
- Stenomorpha compressa (Horn, 1870)
- Stenomorpha confluens (LeConte, 1851)
- Stenomorpha congruens (Casey, 1912)
- Stenomorpha consentanea (Casey, 1912)
- Stenomorpha consobrina (Horn, 1870)
- Stenomorpha consors (Casey, 1912)
- Stenomorpha consueta (Casey, 1912)
- Stenomorpha convexa (LeConte, 1859)
- Stenomorpha convexicollis (LeConte, 1854)
- Stenomorpha corrugans (Casey, 1912)
- Stenomorpha costata Solier, 1836
- Stenomorpha crassa (Casey, 1912)
- Stenomorpha cressoni (Blaisdell, 1933)
- Stenomorpha cribrata (Casey, 1912)
- Stenomorpha crinita (Casey, 1912)
- Stenomorpha deceptor (Casey, 1912)
- Stenomorpha difficilis (Champion, 1884)
- Stenomorpha directa (Casey, 1912)
- Stenomorpha divaricata (Blaisdell, 1923)
- Stenomorpha dolosa (Casey, 1912)
- Stenomorpha durangoensis (Casey, 1912)
- Stenomorpha embaphionides (Horn, 1894)
- Stenomorpha evanescens (Casey, 1912)
- Stenomorpha evertissima (Casey, 1912)
- Stenomorpha eximia (Casey, 1912)
- Stenomorpha facilis (Casey, 1912)
- Stenomorpha fastigiosa (Casey, 1912)
- Stenomorpha flohri (Champion, 1892)
- Stenomorpha foeda (Champion, 1892)
- Stenomorpha forreri (Champion, 1884)
- Stenomorpha funesta (Champion, 1884)
- Stenomorpha furcata (Champion, 1892)
- Stenomorpha gabbii (Horn, 1880)
- Stenomorpha geminata (Champion, 1892)
- Stenomorpha globicollis (Casey, 1912)
- Stenomorpha gracilior (Casey, 1912)
- Stenomorpha gracilipes (Casey, 1912)
- Stenomorpha granicollis (Blaisdell, 1923)
- Stenomorpha gravidipes (Casey, 1912)
- Stenomorpha hirsuta (LeConte, 1851)
- Stenomorpha hispidula (LeConte, 1851)
- Stenomorpha horrida (Champion, 1892)
- Stenomorpha huachucae (Casey, 1912)
- Stenomorpha humeralis (Triplehorn & Flores, 2002)
- Stenomorpha idahoensis (Boddy, 1957)
- Stenomorpha ignava (Casey, 1912)
- Stenomorpha immunda (Casey, 1912)
- Stenomorpha impetrata (Horn, 1894)
- Stenomorpha implicans (Casey, 1912)
- Stenomorpha impotens (Casey, 1912)
- Stenomorpha inhabilis (Casey, 1912)
- Stenomorpha integra (Casey, 1912)
- Stenomorpha lata (Champion, 1884)
- Stenomorpha latissima (Champion, 1892)
- Stenomorpha lecontei (Horn, 1866)
- Stenomorpha lecontella (Blaisdell, 1936)
- Stenomorpha luctata (Horn, 1870)
- Stenomorpha lugubris (Wilke, 1922)
- Stenomorpha lutulenta (Doyen, 1990)
- Stenomorpha macra (Horn, 1883)
- Stenomorpha magnifica (Pallister, 1954)
- Stenomorpha mancipata (Horn, 1878)
- Stenomorpha marginata LeConte, 1851
- Stenomorpha maritima (Casey, 1912)
- Stenomorpha mckittricki (Pierce, 1954)
- Stenomorpha montezuma Wilke, 1922
- Stenomorpha moricoides (Champion, 1892)
- Stenomorpha muricatula (LeConte, 1851)
- Stenomorpha musiva Wilke, 1922
- Stenomorpha neutralis (Casey, 1912)
- Stenomorpha nitidula (Casey, 1912)
- Stenomorpha obliterata (Champion, 1892)
- Stenomorpha oblonga (Casey, 1912)
- Stenomorpha obovata LeConte, 1851
- Stenomorpha obsidiana (Casey, 1912)
- Stenomorpha obsoleta (LeConte, 1851)
- Stenomorpha olsoni (Triplehorn & Flores, 2002)
- Stenomorpha opaca (Say, 1824)
- Stenomorpha oregonensis (Casey, 1924)
- Stenomorpha orizabae Wilke, 1922
- Stenomorpha palmeri (Champion, 1884)
- Stenomorpha papagoana (Casey, 1912)
- Stenomorpha parallela (LeConte, 1851)
- Stenomorpha pinalica (Casey, 1912)
- Stenomorpha planata (Horn, 1894)
- Stenomorpha polita (Say, 1824)
- Stenomorpha pollens (Casey, 1912)
- Stenomorpha procurrens (Casey, 1912)
- Stenomorpha pubescens (Champion, 1884)
- Stenomorpha puncticollis (LeConte, 1866)
- Stenomorpha quadricollis (Horn, 1880)
- Stenomorpha rimata (LeConte, 1854)
- Stenomorpha roosevelti Smith, Miller & Wheeler 2011
- Stenomorpha rudis (Casey, 1912)
- Stenomorpha rufipes (Champion, 1884)
- Stenomorpha rugata (Casey, 1912)
- Stenomorpha rugicollis (Triplehorn & Brown, 1971)
- Stenomorpha rustica (Casey, 1912)
- Stenomorpha satiata (Casey, 1912)
- Stenomorpha segregata (Champion, 1892)
- Stenomorpha semilaevis (Horn, 1870)
- Stenomorpha semirufa (Casey, 1912)
- Stenomorpha servilis (Casey, 1912)
- Stenomorpha severa (Casey, 1912)
- Stenomorpha socialis (Casey, 1912)
- Stenomorpha speculata (Blaisdell, 1936)
- Stenomorpha sphaericollis (Champion, 1884)
- Stenomorpha spinimanus (Champion, 1892)
- Stenomorpha sponsor (Casey, 1912)
- Stenomorpha spurcans (Casey, 1912)
- Stenomorpha strigosula (Casey, 1912)
- Stenomorpha suavis (Casey, 1912)
- Stenomorpha subcruenta (Casey, 1912)
- Stenomorpha subcylindrica (Horn, 1870)
- Stenomorpha subelegans (Casey, 1912)
- Stenomorpha subpilosa Solier, 1836
- Stenomorpha suturalis (Champion, 1884)
- Stenomorpha tarda (Champion, 1892)
- Stenomorpha tenebrosa (Champion, 1892)
- Stenomorpha tensa (Casey, 1912)
- Stenomorpha tenuicollis (Triplehorn, 1967)
- Stenomorpha tetrica (Casey, 1912)
- Stenomorpha thoracica (Champion, 1884)
- Stenomorpha tularensis (Casey, 1912)
- Stenomorpha tumidicollis Blaisdell, 1943
- Stenomorpha uhdei Wilke, 1922
- Stenomorpha umbrosa (Champion, 1884)
- Stenomorpha unicostata (Champion, 1892)
- Stenomorpha vigens (Casey, 1912)
- Stenomorpha villosa (Champion, 1884)
- Stenomorpha wickhami (Horn, 1894)
- Stenomorpha zacatecensis (Pallister, 1954)
