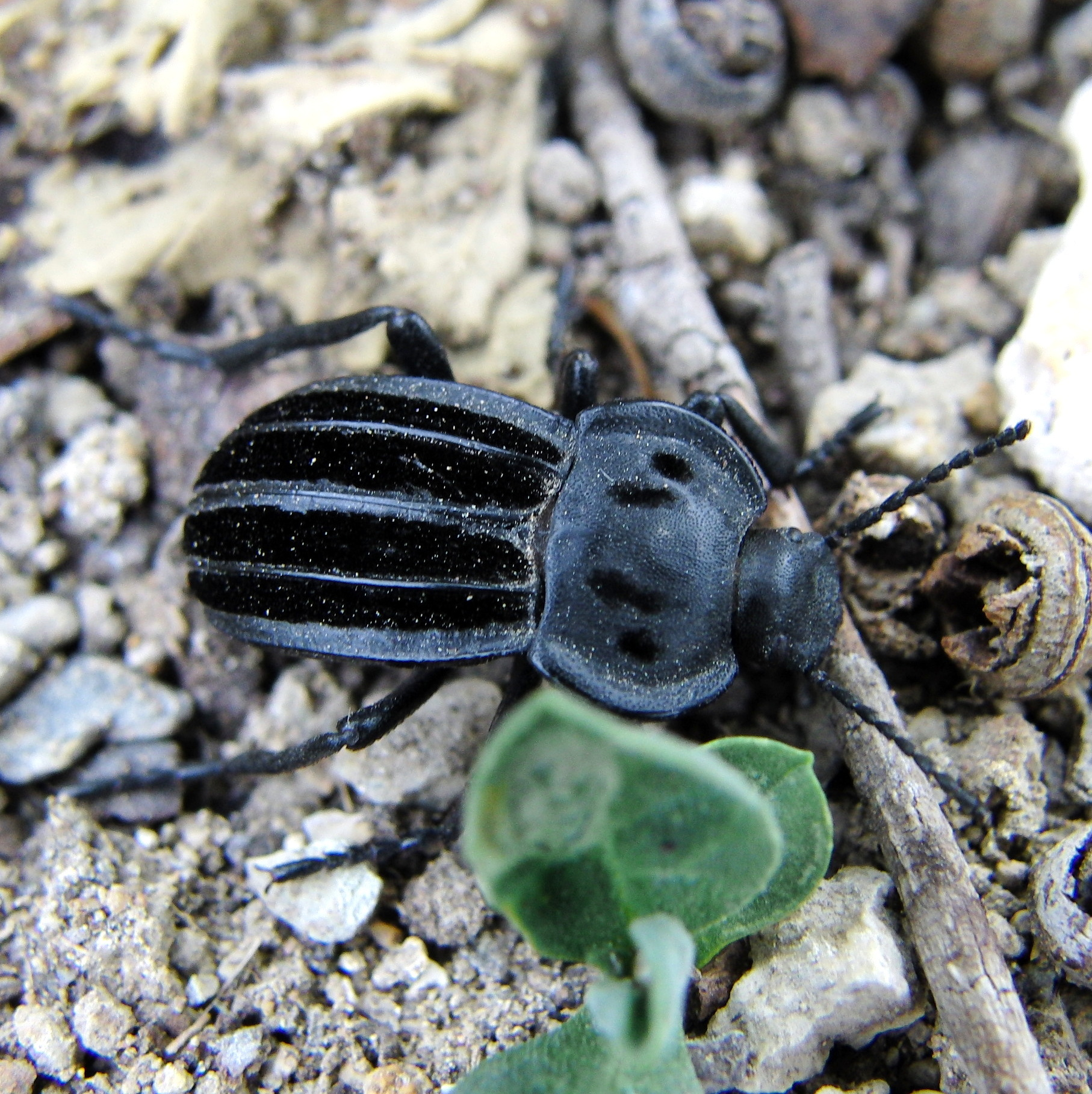

Scientific classification
- Kingdom: Animalia
- Phylum: Arthropoda
- Clade: Pancrustacea
- Class: Insecta
- Order: Coleoptera
- Suborder: Polyphaga
- Infraorder: Cucujiformia
- Family: Tenebrionidae
- Genus: Alphasida
- Species: A. holosericea

Binomial name
- Alphasida holosericea Germar, 1824

= Alphasida holosericea =

Species of beetle

Alphasida holosericea is a species of beetle of the darkling beetles family.

== Distribution ==
Its area of distribution seems to be limited to Málaga and the surrounding area.
