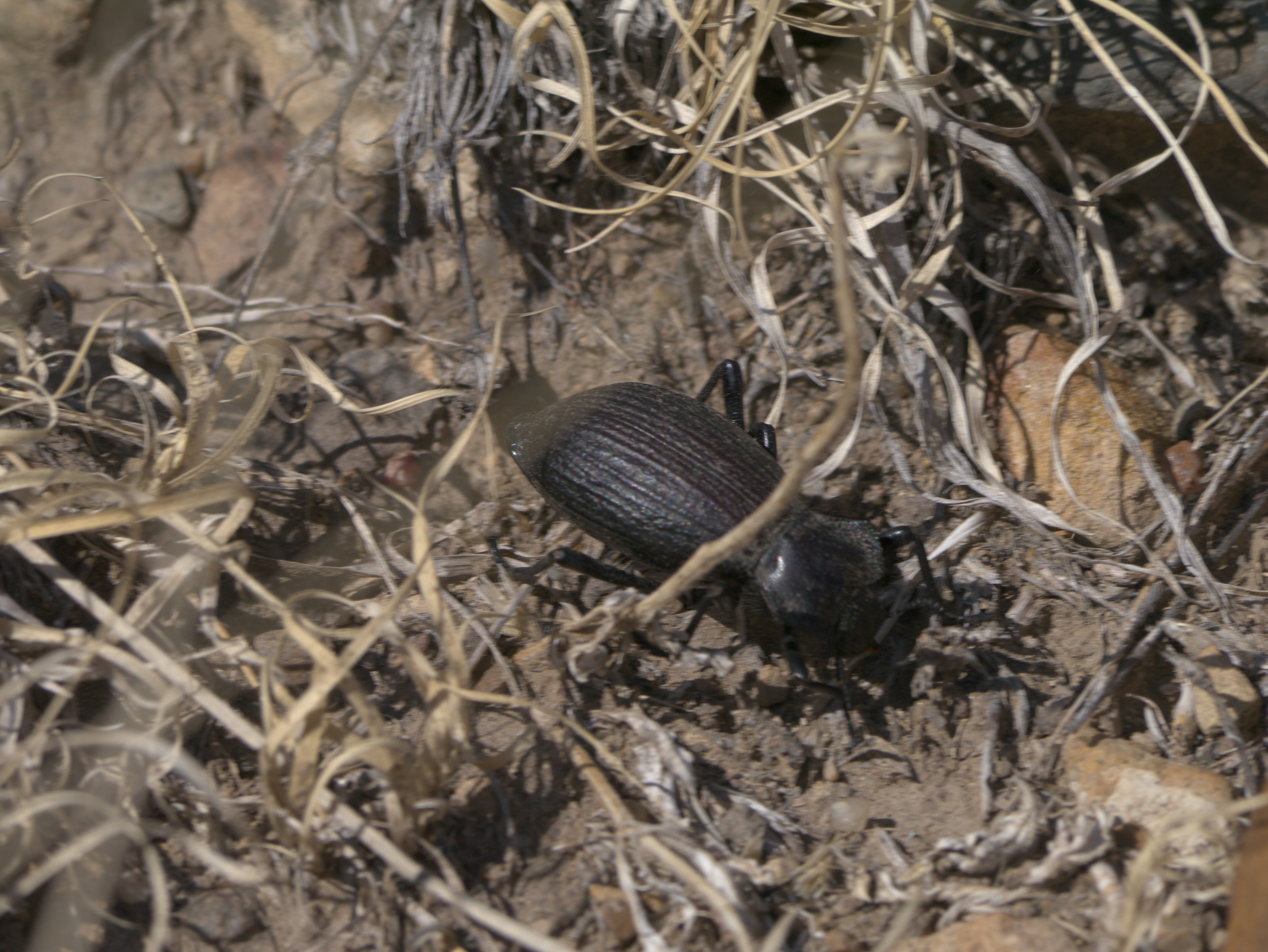
- Philolithus sp.

Scientific classification
- Domain: Eukaryota
- Kingdom: Animalia
- Phylum: Arthropoda
- Class: Insecta
- Order: Coleoptera
- Suborder: Polyphaga
- Infraorder: Cucujiformia
- Family: Tenebrionidae
- Subfamily: Pimeliinae
- Tribe: Asidini; Fleming, 1821

= Asidini =

Tribe of beetles

Asidini is a tribe of darkling beetles in the subfamily Pimeliinae of the family Tenebrionidae. There are more than 30 genera in Asidini.

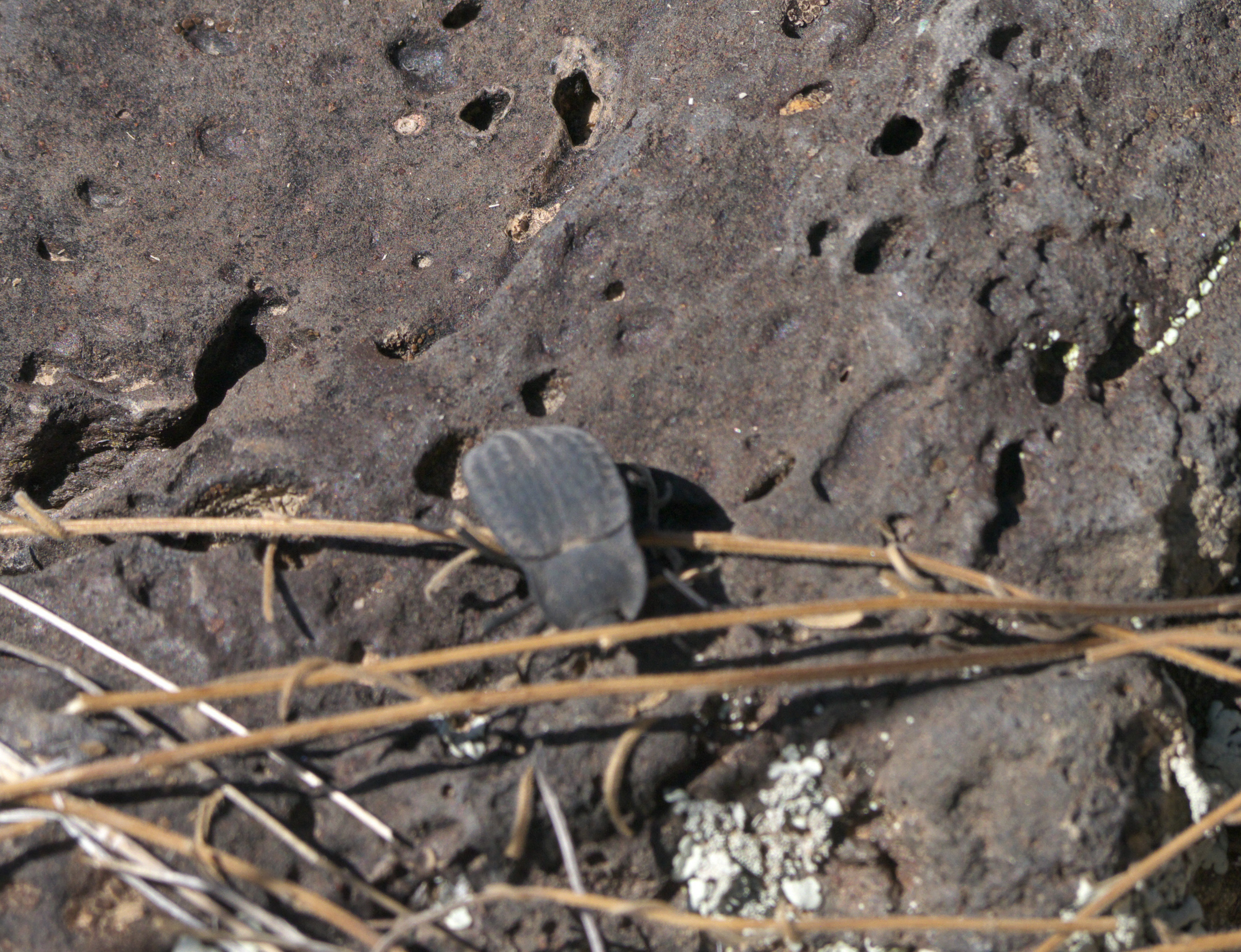
Stenomorpha opaca

== Genera ==
These genera belong to the tribe Asidini:

- Afrasida Wilke, 1922 (tropical Africa)
- Alphasida Escalera, 1905 (the Palearctic)
- Amachla Koch, 1962 (tropical Africa)
- Andremiopsis Chatanay, 1913 (tropical Africa)
- Andremius Fairmaire, 1903 (tropical Africa)
- Ardamimicus Smith, 2013 (North America)
- Asida Latreille, 1802 (the Palearctic)
- Asidesthes Fairmaire, 1900 (tropical Africa)
- Asidomorpha Koch, 1962 (tropical Africa)
- Bartolozzia Ferrer, 1998 (tropical Africa)
- Cardigenius Solier, 1836 (the Neotropics)
- Craniotus LeConte, 1851 (North America)
- Cryptasida Koch, 1962 (tropical Africa)
- Euryprosternum Chatanay, 1914 (tropical Africa)
- Ferveoventer Smith, 2013 (North America)
- Heterasida Casey, 1912 (North America)
- Kochotella Bouchard & Bousquet, 2021 (tropical Africa)
- Leptasida Chatanay, 1914 (tropical Africa)
- Litasida Casey, 1912 (North America)
- Machla Herbst, 1799 (tropical Africa)
- Machleida Fåhraeus, 1870 (tropical Africa)
- Machlomorpha Péringuey, 1899 (tropical Africa)
- Micrasida Smith, 2013 (North America)
- Microschatia Solier, 1836 (North America)
- Oxyge Chatanay, 1914 (tropical Africa)
- Pelecyphorus Solier, 1836 (North America)
- Philolithus Lacordaire, 1858 (North America)
- Prosodidius Fairmaire, 1903 (tropical Africa)
- Pseudasida Fairmaire, 1895 (tropical Africa)
- Saeculum Kaminski, Kanda & Smith, 2021 (tropical Africa)
- Scotinesthes Fairmaire, 1895 (tropical Africa)
- Scotinus W. Kirby, 1819 (the Neotropics)
- Stenomorpha Solier, 1836 (North America)
- Tamatasida Koch, 1962 (tropical Africa)
