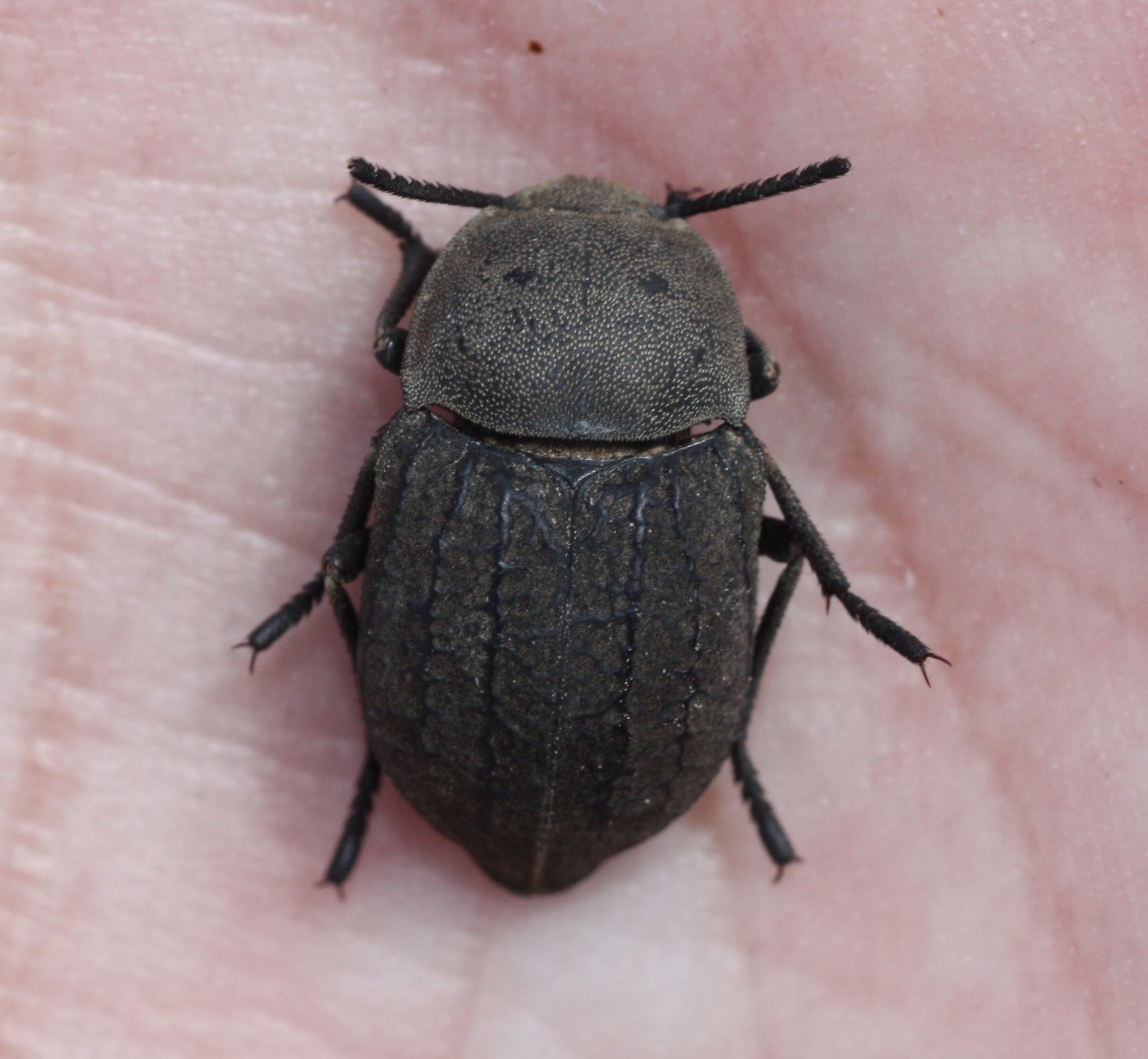
- Microschatia morata

Scientific classification
- Domain: Eukaryota
- Kingdom: Animalia
- Phylum: Arthropoda
- Class: Insecta
- Order: Coleoptera
- Suborder: Polyphaga
- Infraorder: Cucujiformia
- Family: Tenebrionidae
- Subfamily: Pimeliinae
- Tribe: Asidini
- Genus: Microschatia; Solier, 1836

= Microschatia =

Genus of beetle

Microschatia is a genus of beetles native to the drylands of southwestern North America.

== Taxonomy ==
Microschatia contains the following species:

- Microschatia inaequalis
- Microschatia impar
- Microschatia polita
- Microschatia rockefelleri
- Microschatia robusta
- Microschatia punctata
- Microschatia morata
- Microschatia championi
- Microschatia cedrosensis
- Microschatia araneoides
- Microschatia diversa
- Microschatia planata
- Microschatia solieri
- Microschatia sulcipennis
- Microschatia costulata
