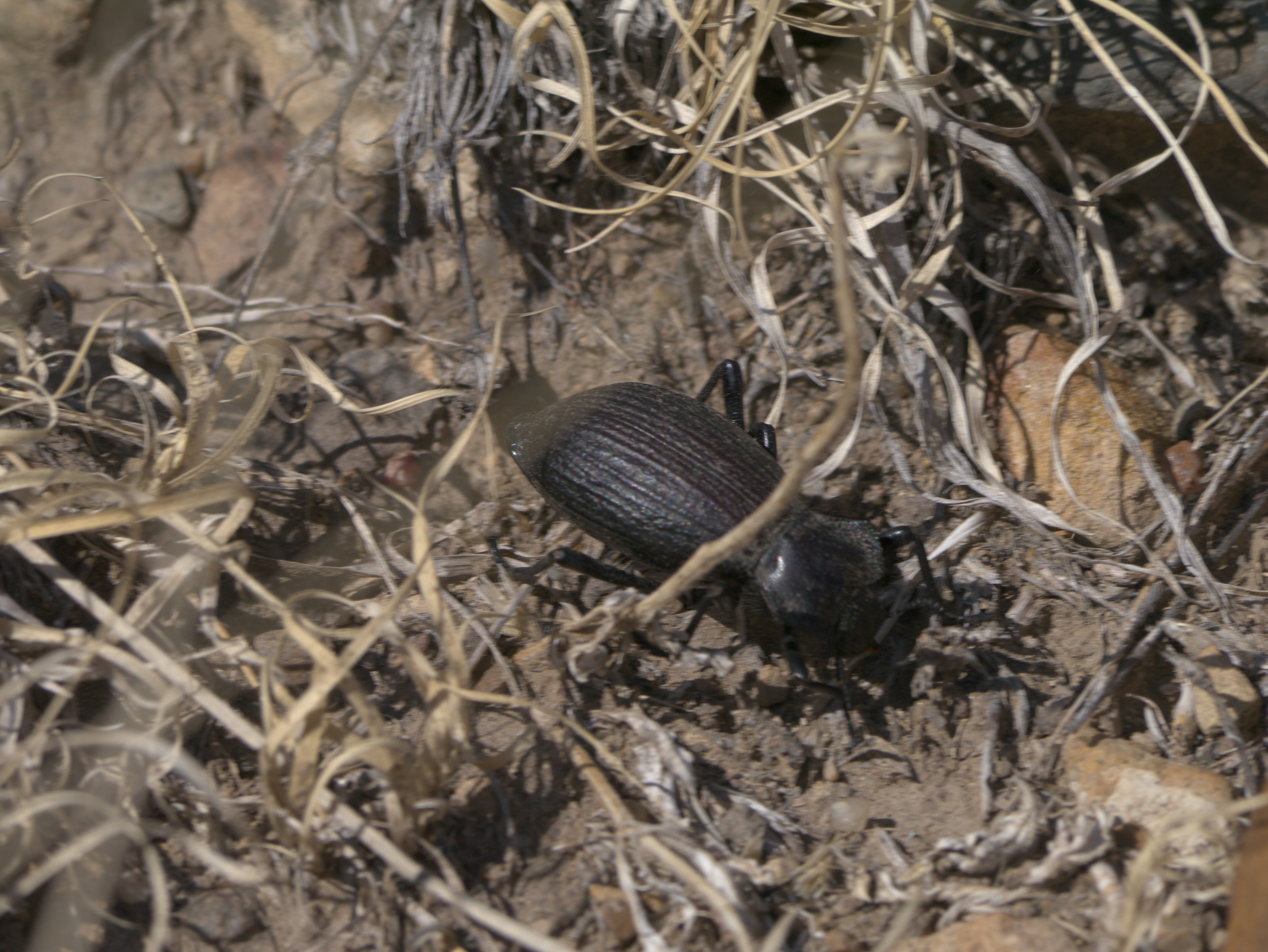
- Philolithus elatus

Scientific classification
- Domain: Eukaryota
- Kingdom: Animalia
- Phylum: Arthropoda
- Class: Insecta
- Order: Coleoptera
- Suborder: Polyphaga
- Infraorder: Cucujiformia
- Family: Tenebrionidae
- Tribe: Asidini
- Genus: Philolithus; Lacordaire, 1858

= Philolithus =

Genus of beetles

Philolithus is a genus of darkling beetles in the family Tenebrionidae. There are about seven described species in the genus Philolithus.

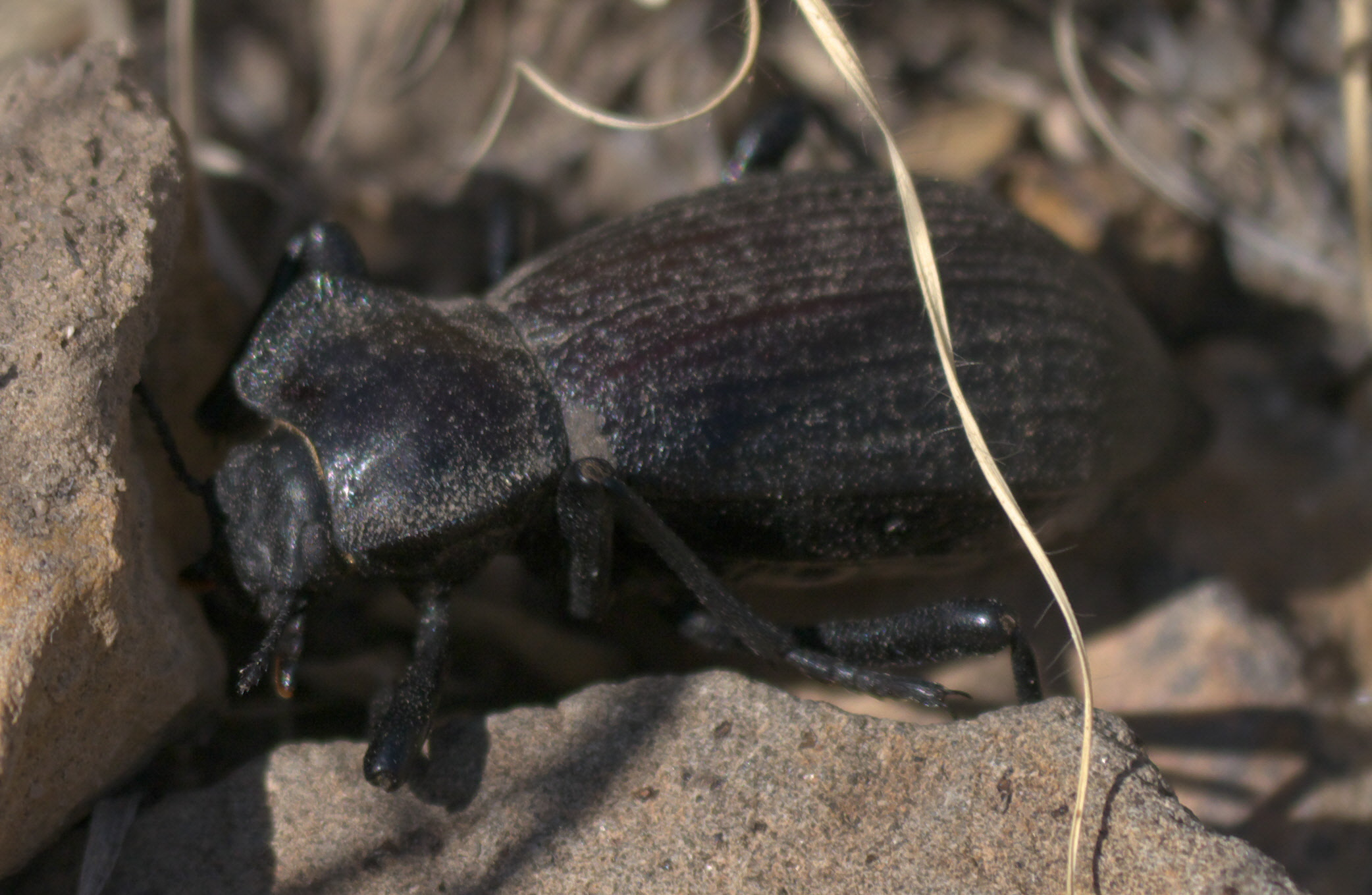

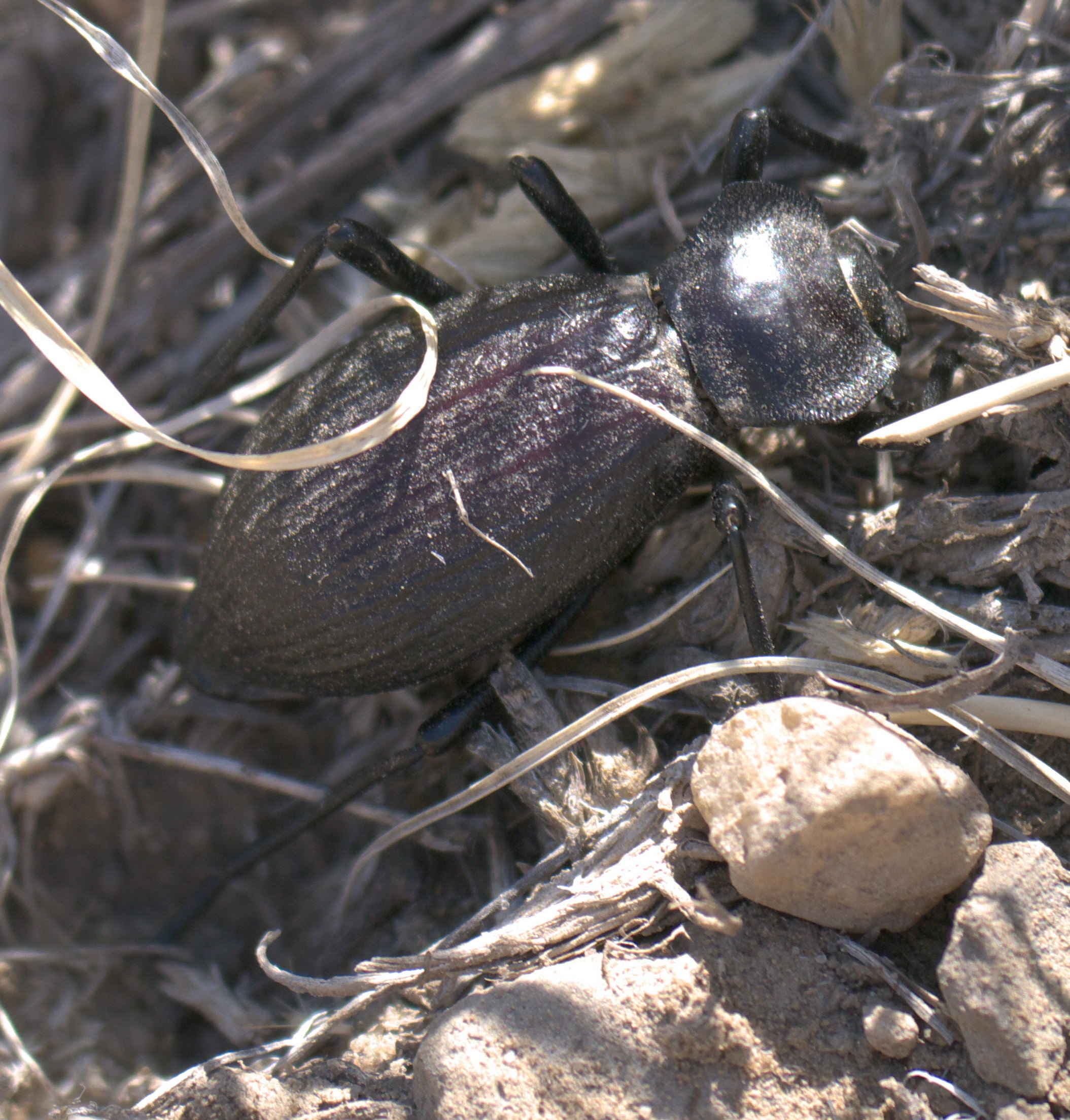

== Species ==
These seven species belong to the genus Philolithus:

- Philolithus actuosus (Horn, 1870)^{b}
- Philolithus aeger^{b}
- Philolithus densicollis (Horn, 1894)^{g b}
- Philolithus elatus^{b}
- Philolithus morbillosus (LeConte, 1858)^{b}
- Philolithus opimus^{b}
- Philolithus sordidus^{b}

Data sources: i = ITIS, c = Catalogue of Life, g = GBIF, b = Bugguide.net
