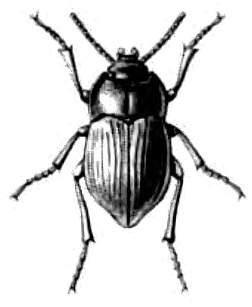
- Pérez Arcas's 1872 illustration of the species

Scientific classification
- Kingdom: Animalia
- Phylum: Arthropoda
- Class: Insecta
- Order: Coleoptera
- Suborder: Polyphaga
- Infraorder: Cucujiformia
- Family: Tenebrionidae
- Genus: Alphasida
- Subgenus: Glabrasida
- Species: A. zapaterii

Binomial name
- Alphasida zapaterii (Pérez Arcas, 1872)

Synonyms
- List: Asida zapateri Pérez Arcas 1872; Glabrasida zapateri zapateri (Pérez Arcas); Viñolas & Cartagena, 2008; Asida (Glabrasida) zapaterii (Pérez Arcas); Escalera, 1923; Asida (Glabrasida) zapaterii var. minor (Pérez Arcas); Escalera, 1943; Alphasida (Glabrasida) zapaterii (Pérez Arcas); Soldati, 2008

= Alphasida zapaterii =

Species of beetle

Alphasida zapaterii, often spelled as Alphasida zapateri, is a species of beetle in the subgenus Glabrasida of the genus Alphasida in the family Tenebrionidae (darkling beetles). Native to Aragon in eastern Spain, A. zapaterii and other Alphasida are relatively homogenous in appearance. A. zapaterii has two recognized subspecies: A. zapaterii zapaterii and A. zapaterii granulosa. The species was first described in 1872 by the entomologist Laureano Pérez Arcas, who named it after the scientist Bernardo Zapater.

== Description ==
Alphasida zapaterii is a species of beetle in the subgenus Glabrasida of the genus Alphasida (sometimes itself considered part of the genus Asida) in the family Tenebrionidae (darkling beetles). The appearance of eastern Iberian Alphasida species are relatively homogenous. The exterior color of A. zapaterii is black, with the beetle's exoskeleton appearing matte on the topside and glossy on the bottom side. Depending on subspecies, the typical A. zapaterii overall length can vary. For the normative subspecies A. zapaterii zapaterii, the typical overall lengths measure between 12 mm (0.47 in) and 14 mm (0.55 in) for males and between 13 mm (0.51 in) and 16 mm (0.63 in) for females, though populations of this subspecies previously classified as the variety minor are shorter in length, at 11 mm (0.43 in) to 13 mm (0.51 in) long. For members of the A. zapaterii granulosa subspecies, the typical overall lengths are between 12 mm (0.47 in) and 14 mm (0.55 in) for males and 13.5 mm (0.53 in) and 16 mm (0.63 in) for females.

A. z. zapaterii and A. z. granulosa can also be distinguished from one another by other exterior features. The beetles of A. z. granulosa have less pronounced ribs than A. z. zapaterii individuals. The granulation on the shagreen-like surface of both subspecies differs slightly, with A. z. granulosa showing more pronounced and – especially on females – irregular granulation.

== Taxonomy ==
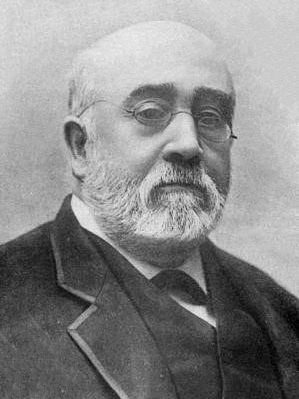
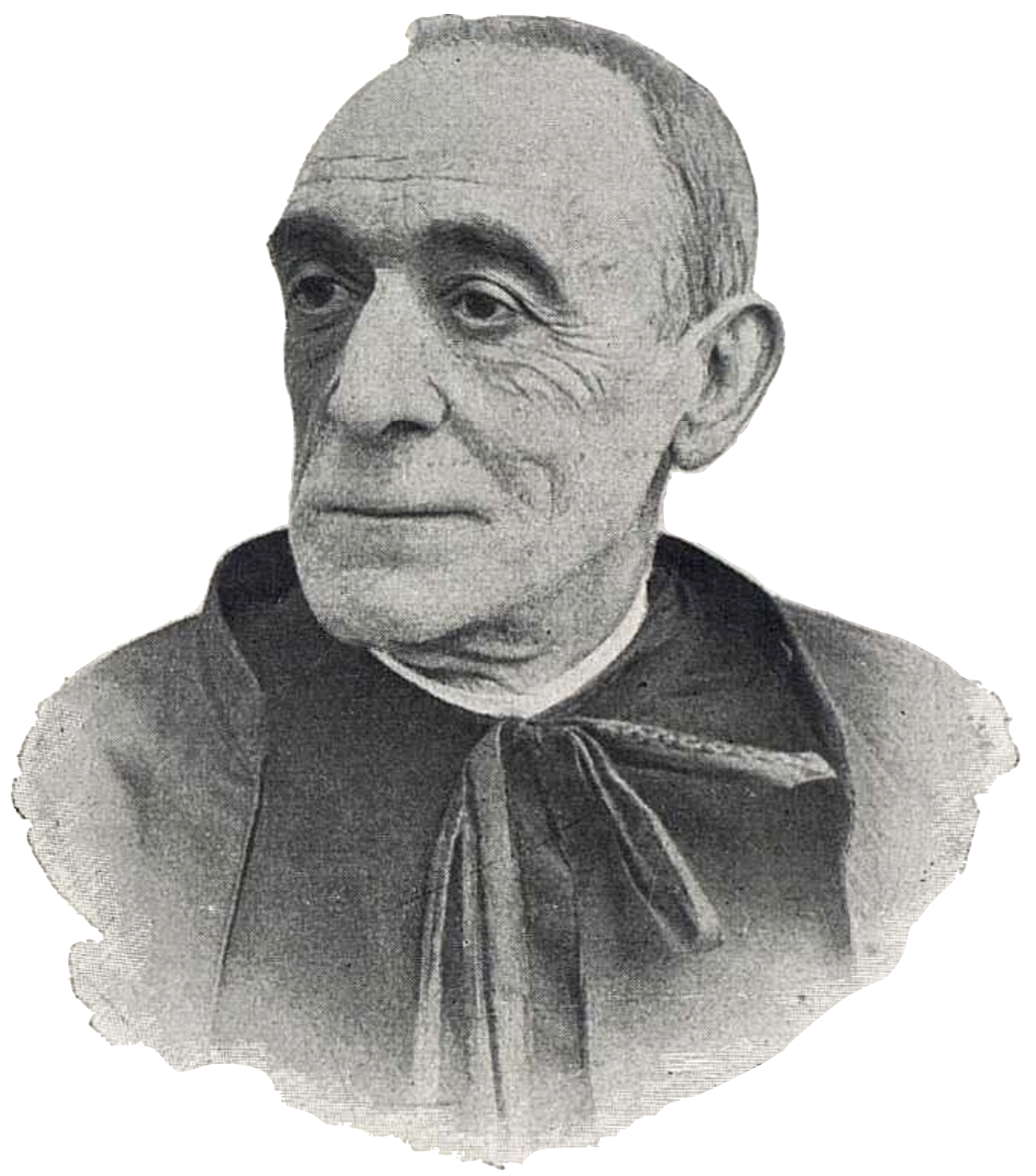
The entomologist Laureano Pérez Arcas (left) described Alphasida zapaterii in 1872, naming the species for the scientist and priest Bernardo Zapater (right).

The species was first described by the Spanish entomologist Laureano Pérez Arcas in 1872 within the first volume of the Anales de la Sociedad Española de Historia Natural. He credited the scientist and priest Bernardo Zapater with collecting the specimen used in the description from Albarracín. For this and other insects that Zapater had collected from the region, Pérez Arcas named the species after Zapater, giving it the binomial Asida zapaterii.

The Spanish entomologist Manuel Martínez de la Escalera described the genus Alphasida in 1905, splitting it from Asida. He then described the subgenus Glabrasida within Alphasida in 1910. Into this subgenus, he placed Asida species from Spain and Algeria which possessed shared features like naked, prominent ribs; A. zapaterii was not included within the subgenus during this first description. Escalera published an examination of the Iberian Glabrasida in 1922. He proposed dividing the subgenus into sections, placing the species he called Glabrasida zapateri within section III of the subgenus, which he named pluricostulatae. Escalera revised his organization of Glabrasida in 1923.

In his 1923 work, Escalera described Glabrasida zapateri as comprising a normative form alongside two varieties. Escalera named the normative form as Glabrasida zapateri, with G. zapateri var. granulosa and G. zapateri var. minor as the new varieties. While G. z. var. granulosa was described as approximately the same size as the normative form but with a different morphology, G. z. var. minor covered populations of smaller members of the species. Glabrasida zapateri frigidissima was at one point described as another form of the species, then described as a separate species by Escalera in 1923, and is now accepted as its own species under the name Alphasida frigidissima.

In 2008, within a revision of the taxonomic nomenclature used for Tenebrionoidea, Soldati addressed the use of the name Asida zapateri that had sometimes been used to describe the species. They wrote that it was an incorrect spelling and that Asida zapaterii was the original and correct spelling. As of 2025, the Fauna Europaea accepts the species as Alphasida zapateri.

The entomologists Francisco Pérez-Vera and José M. Ávila published revisions of Escalera's organization of Glabrasida and described pluricostulatae as group IV within the subgenus. Through analysis of specimens and review of distribution, Pérez-Vera and Ávila accepted Alphasida zapaterii and described it as comprising two subspecies: A. zapaterii zapaterii (Escalera's normative form) and A. zapaterii granulosa (Escalera's G. z. var. granulosa). While acknowledging the existence of populations aligned with the description of Escalera's G. z. var. minor, they noted their distribution and morphology as overlaping with A. zapaterii zapaterii and synonymized the variety to that subspecies.

== Evolution ==
As noted by Escalera alongside his 1943 descriptions of several new Asida species, A. zapaterii populations were undergoing substantial evolution, and the A. zapaterii in and around Albarracín were developing traits that made it difficult to distinguish some populations from other closely related species nearby. This contributed to his description of a var. minor encompassing smaller members of the species that overlapped with the eastern distribution of A. zapaterii zapaterii subspecies. While Pérez-Vera and Ávila agreed that the A. zapaterii populations were deriving new traits that deviated substantially from the A. zapaterii zapaterii, they still considered var. minor synonymous with the A. zapaterii zapaterii subspecies due to a congruous distribution and shared morphological traits.

== Distribution ==
Species and subspecies, including A. zapaterii, within group IV of the subgenus Glabrasida are all native to the eastern portion of the Iberian Peninsula. The subspecies A. zapaterii zapaterii inhabits the central portion of the Montes Universales, a mountain range in eastern Spain. It is particularly present in the Sierra de Albarracín mountain range in the province of Teruel, with populations to the north at lower altitudes at Gallocanta in the province of Zaragoza and in the southwestern portion of the province of Cuenca. The populations of A. zapaterii granulosa are discretely distributed to the west of the A. zapaterii zapaterii populations. A. zapaterii granulosa can be found in the mountains in the southern part of the province of Soria, the western portion of the province of Guadalajara, and the northwestern portion of the province of Cuenca.
