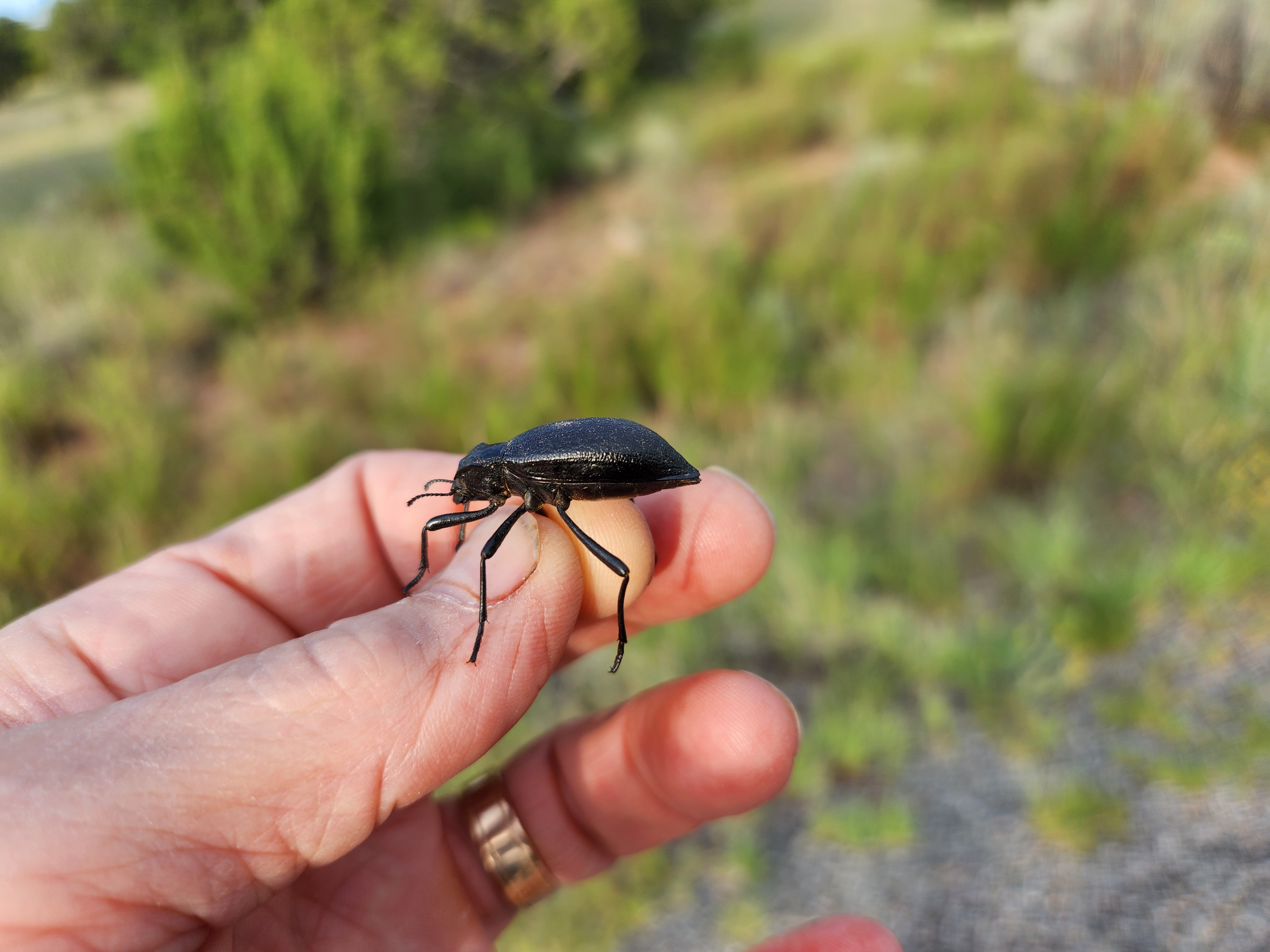
- Philolithus elatus infernus collected in Santa Fe, New Mexico, USA. August 2024

Scientific classification
- Kingdom: Animalia
- Phylum: Arthropoda
- Clade: Pancrustacea
- Class: Insecta
- Order: Coleoptera
- Suborder: Polyphaga
- Infraorder: Cucujiformia
- Family: Tenebrionidae
- Genus: Philolithus
- Species: P. elatus

Binomial name
- Philolithus elatus (LeConte, 1853)
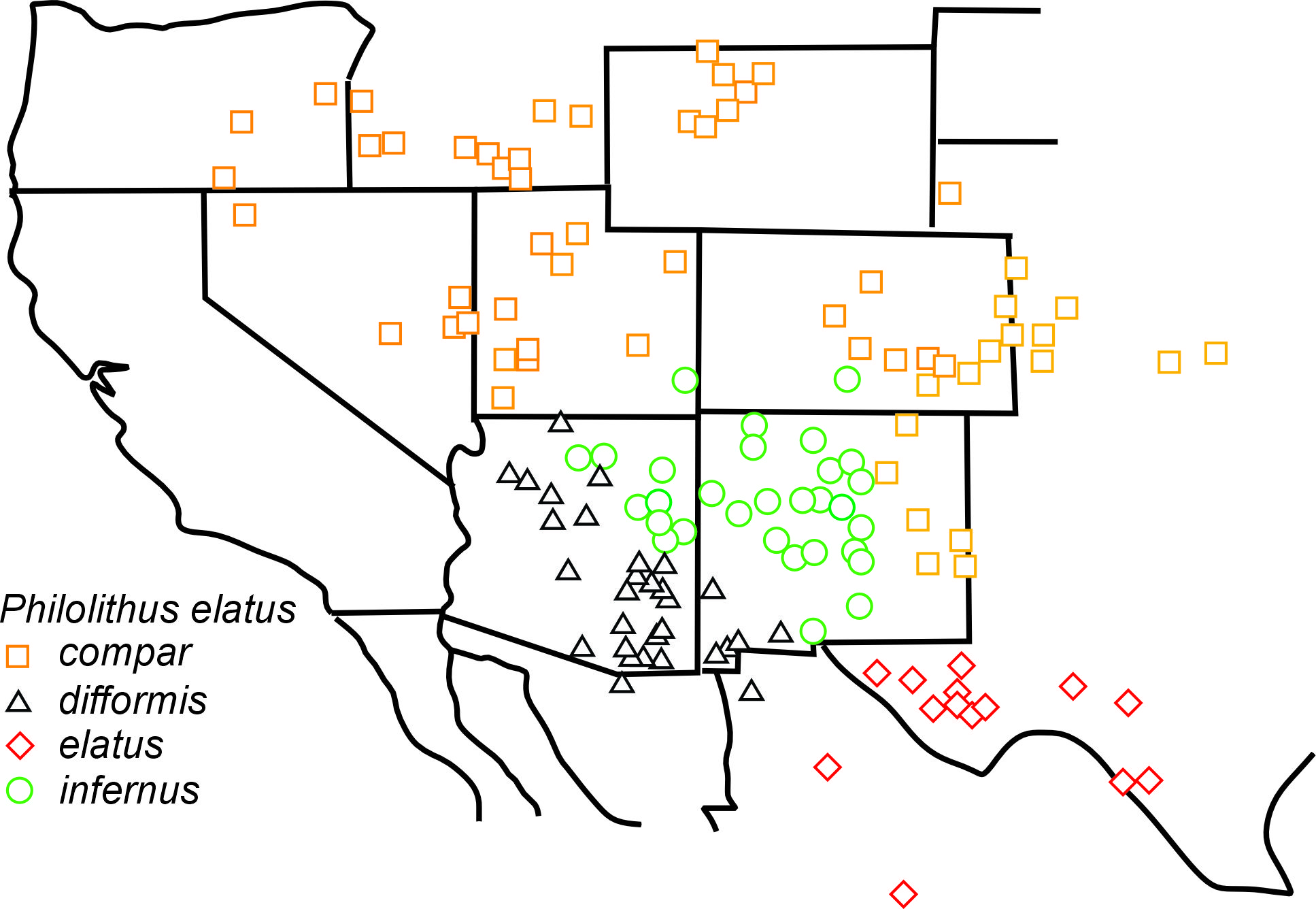
- Distribution of P. elatus, modified from Brown, 1971. Each symbol represents a published record, and colors indicate the ranges of the four subspecies.

Synonyms
- Pelecyphorus elatus LeConte 1853; Gonasida elata (LeConte, 1853)

= Philolithus elatus =

Species of beetle

Philolithus elatus is a species of darkling beetle from western North America.

== Description ==
Philolithus elatus is 21–35 mm (0.83–1.38 in) in length, making it a relatively large beetle in the family Tenebrionidae. It is shiny black with the surface of the pronotum (dorsal prothorax) being smooth and convex in the middle, while the margins are expanded, flex upward, and are spotted with punctures. There is a distinct constriction between the prothorax and elytra, and the patterning of the elytra varies by subspecies:

- Philolithus elatus compar: Carinae (longitudinal ridges) on elytra are clear and well-defined. Lateral margins of pronotum not as strongly angled or reflexed as in P. e. difformis.
- Philolithus elatus difformis: Carinae on elytra are clear and well-defined. Lateral margins of pronotum strongly angled and reflexed.
- Philolithus elatus elatus: Carinae on elytra are poorly defined or not visible; surfaces appear rough. Lateral margins of pronotum strongly angled and reflexed.
- Philolithus elatus infernus: Carinae on elytra are poorly defined or not visible; surfaces appear rough. Lateral margins of pronotum not as strongly angled or reflexed.

== Range and habitat ==
Found in shrub savannas, pinyon-juniper savannas, shrub steppes, grassy steppes, grasslands, sagebrush steppe, and desert shrub areas throughout western North America. Each subspecies occupies a subset of this range, with modest overlap between them.

== Ecology ==
The natural history of Philolithus elatus has not been studied extensively, but, based on the ecology of other tenebrionid beetles, it is expected to be a detritivore that plays an important role in nutrient cycling. The beetle is large, energy-rich, and readily eaten by predators, and are therefore expected to be a significant food source when present.

Based on observations of Philolithus densicollis larvae are expected to live underground for multiple years. Adult Philolithus elatus emerge in late summer and early fall, and survive for about one month.

Adults lay eggs on mounds of Pogonomyrmex ants.

== Mimicry ==
Many species of tenebrionid beetles produce defensive chemicals such as quinones from glands in their abdomens. However, like other members of the subfamily Pimeliinae, Philolithus elatus does not have defensive glands. Nonetheless, the species is believed to receive some protection due to its resemblance to the chemically-defended Eleodes obscura. The mimicry may be enhanced by the fact that each subspecies of Philolithus elatus bears a close resemblance to a sympatric subspecies of E. obscura. This is an example of Batesian mimicry, in which a benign species derives protection through its resemblance to a noxious model. In this case, the mimic (Philolithus) is expected to benefit from not having to expend energy and water in developing the glands and producing the defensive chemicals.

It has also been reported that Philolithus not only mimics the physical appearance of Eleodes, but also the characteristic "headstanding" defensive posture.
