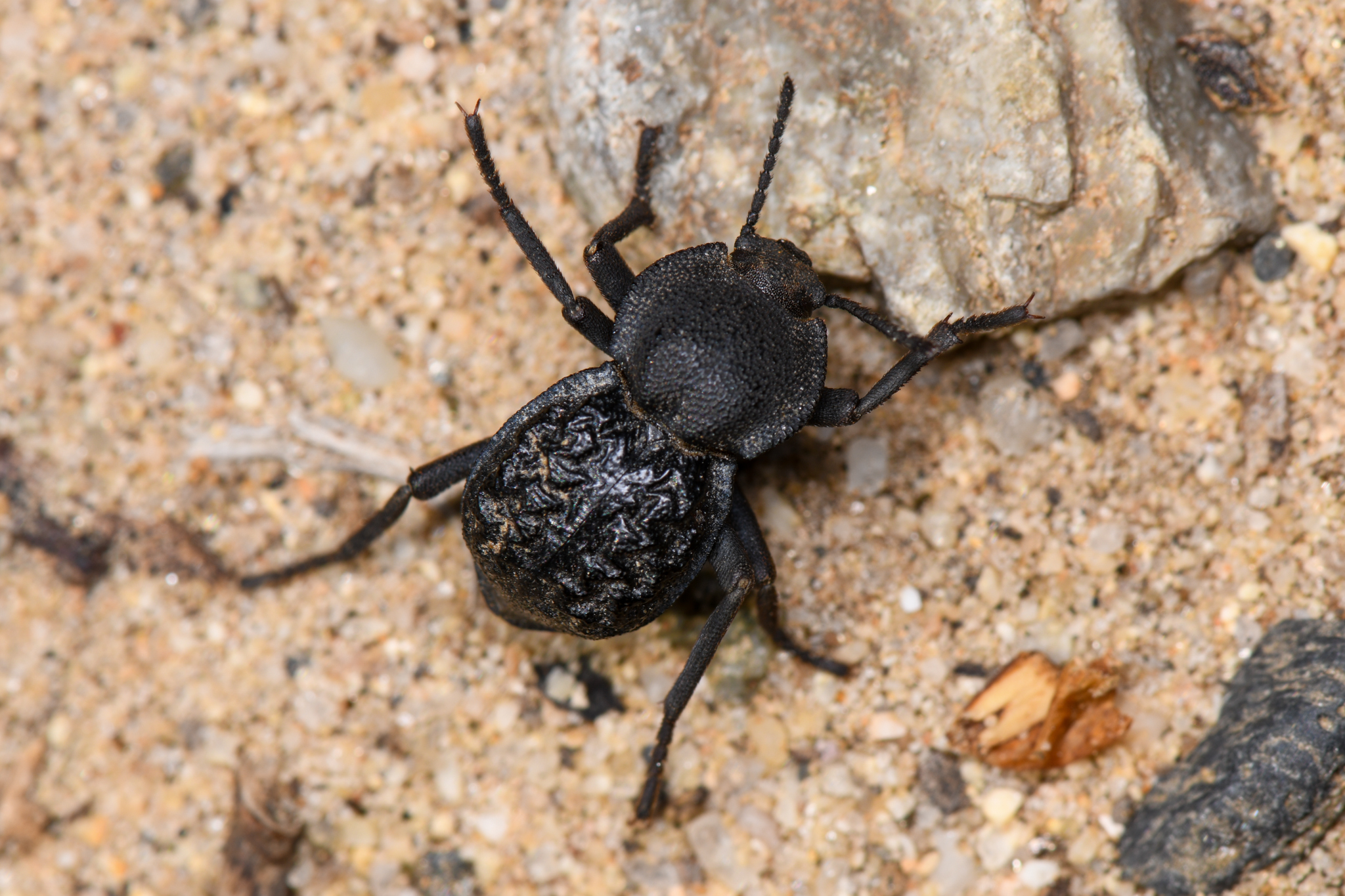

Scientific classification
- Domain: Eukaryota
- Kingdom: Animalia
- Phylum: Arthropoda
- Class: Insecta
- Order: Coleoptera
- Suborder: Polyphaga
- Infraorder: Cucujiformia
- Family: Tenebrionidae
- Genus: Microschatia
- Species: M. inaequalis

Binomial name
- Microschatia inaequalis LeConte, 1851

= Microschatia inaequalis =

North American beetle

Microschatia inaequalis is a species of darkling beetle indigenous to North America. It is found southern California south of Los Angeles and in northern Baja California Norte.
