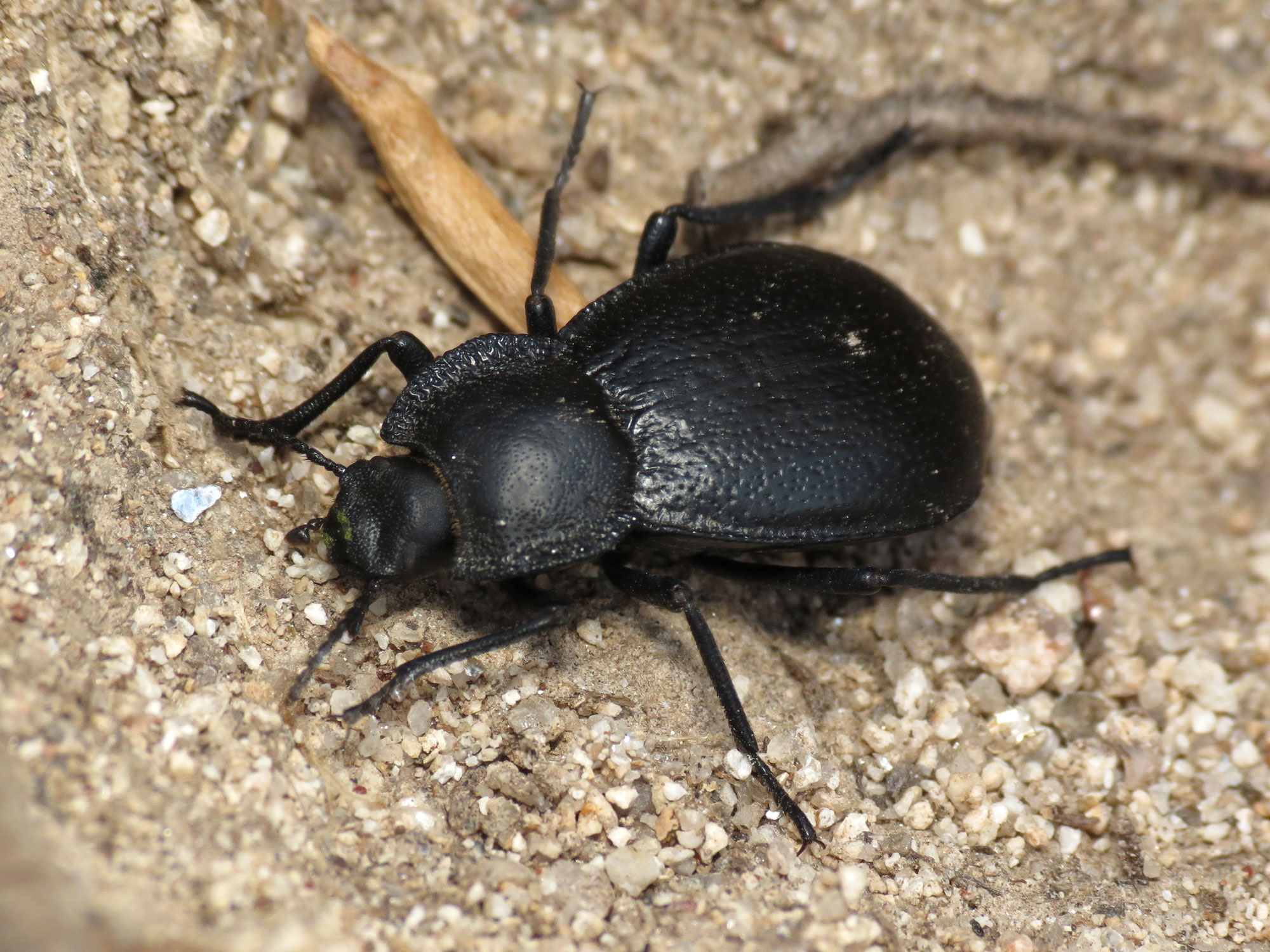
- Stenomorpha marginata

Scientific classification
- Domain: Eukaryota
- Kingdom: Animalia
- Phylum: Arthropoda
- Class: Insecta
- Order: Coleoptera
- Suborder: Polyphaga
- Infraorder: Cucujiformia
- Family: Tenebrionidae
- Subfamily: Pimeliinae
- Tribe: Asidini
- Genus: Stenomorpha; Solier, 1836

Subgenera
- Asidina; Asidopsis; Bothrasida; Megasida; Notiasida; Platasida; Pycnomorpha; Stenomorpha; Stethasida; Trichiasida

Diversity
- at least 150 species

= Stenomorpha =

Genus of beetles

Stenomorpha is a genus of darkling beetles in the family Tenebrionidae. There are more than 160 described species/subspecies in Stenomorpha.

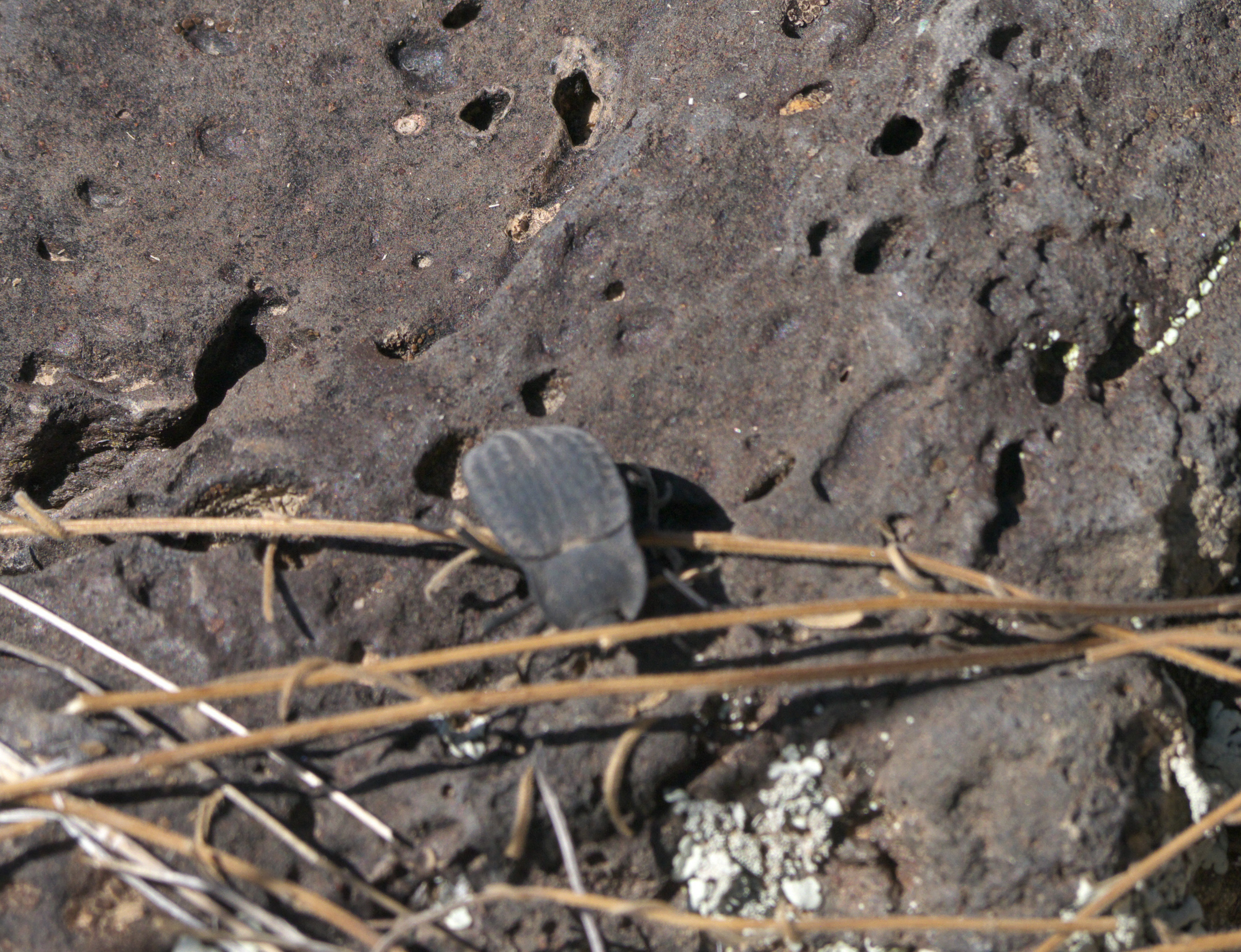
Stenomorpha opaca

== See also ==
- List of Stenomorpha species
