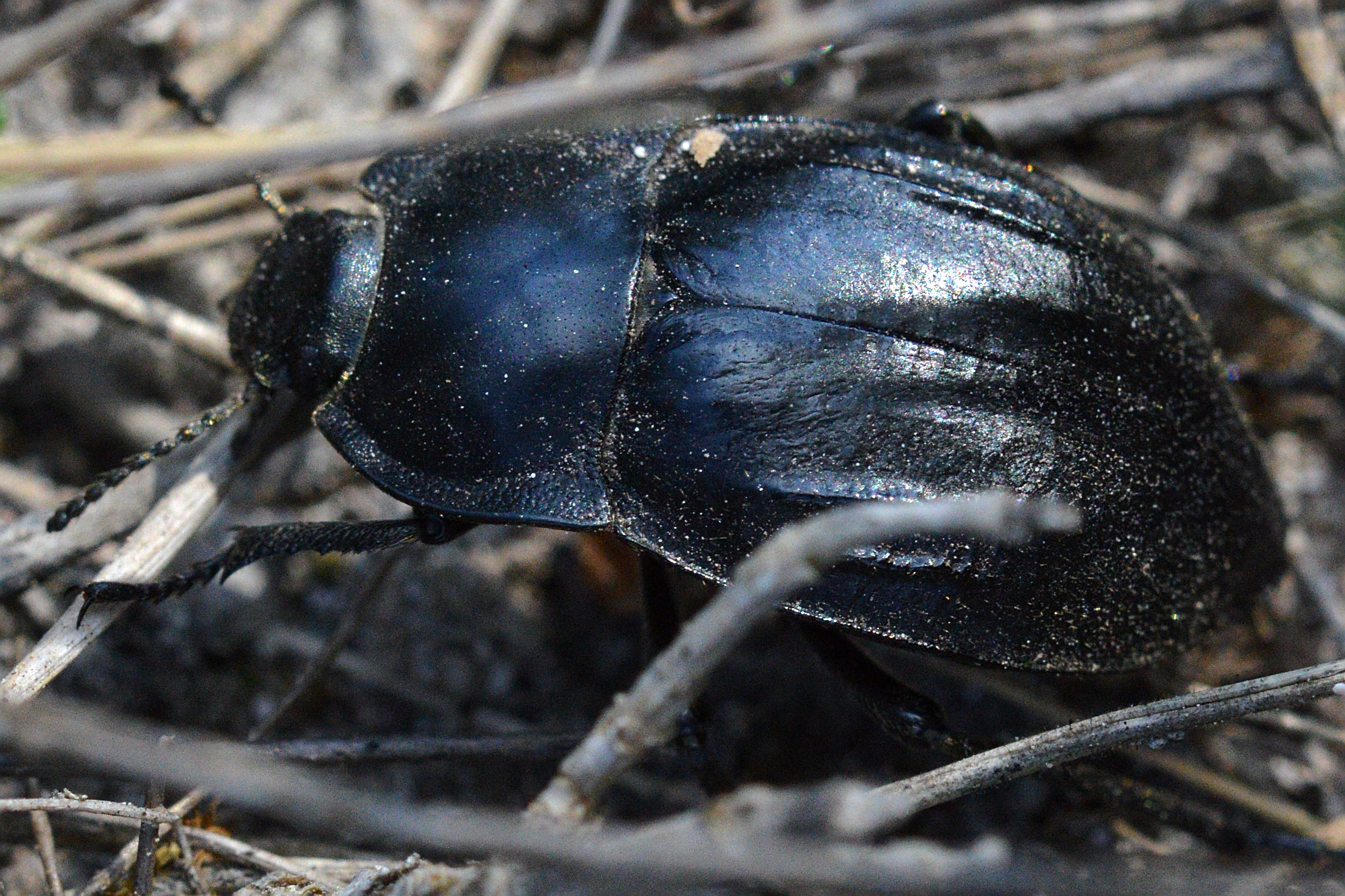
- Alphasida depressa

Scientific classification
- Kingdom: Animalia
- Phylum: Arthropoda
- Class: Insecta
- Order: Coleoptera
- Suborder: Polyphaga
- Infraorder: Cucujiformia
- Family: Tenebrionidae
- Tribe: Asidini
- Genus: Alphasida; Escalera, 1905

Subgenera
- Alphasida (Alphasida); Alphasida (Aplanasida); Alphasida (Aulonasida); Alphasida (Betasida); Alphasida (Crirasida); Alphasida (Durasida); Alphasida (Elongasida); Alphasida (Glabrasida); Alphasida (Granasida); Alphasida (Gymnetasida); Alphasida (Machlasida); Alphasida (Melambasida); Alphasida (Mimelasida); Alphasida (Pedarasida); Alphasida (Pseudoelongasida)

Synonyms
- List: Aplanasida Reitter, 1917; Aulonasida Reitter, 1917; Betasida Reitter, 1917; Cribrasida Reitter, 1917; Crirasida Gebien, 1937; Durasida Reitter, 1917; Elongasida Martinez Escalera, 1906; Glabrasida Reitter, 1917; Glabrasida de la Escalera, 1910; Granasida Reitter, 1917; Gymnetasida Reitter, 1917; Machlasida Martinez Escalera, 1907; Melambasida Reitter, 1917; Mimelasida Reitter, 1917; Pedarasida Reitter, 1917; Protomachlasida Escalera, 1928; Pseudoelongasida Escalera, 1922; Subalphasida Escalera, 1928

= Alphasida =

Genus of beetles

Alphasida is a genus of beetles in the family Tenebrionidae.

The species of this genus are found in southern Europe, northern Africa and North America.

== Species ==
The following species are recognised in the genus Alphasida:

- Alphasida alcirensis Reitter, 1917
- Alphasida alonensis (Martinez y Saez, 1873)
- Alphasida altomirana (Escalera, 1923)
- Alphasida annina Reitter, 1917
- Alphasida ardoisi Reitter, 1917
- Alphasida argenteolimbata (Escalera, 1901)
- Alphasida asperata (Solier, 1836)
- Alphasida asturica Schuster, 1928
- Alphasida baezensis (Escalera, 1922)
- Alphasida becerrae (Escalera, 1905)
- Alphasida bolivari (Escalera, 1906)
- Alphasida boscai (Escalera, 1922)
- Alphasida brevipubens Reitter, 1917
- Alphasida calumniata (Escalera, 1925)
- Alphasida candeledana Pérez-Vera & Ávila Sánchez-Jofré, 2016
- Alphasida castellana (Graells, 1858)
- Alphasida conjucta (Escalera, 1923)
- Alphasida cordubensis (Escalera, 1923)
- Alphasida cortesensis Reitter, 1917
- Alphasida cossyrensis Reitter, 1917
- Alphasida costulata (Solier, 1836)
- Alphasida crassicollis (Fairmaire, 1868)
- Alphasida dantini (Escalera, 1922)
- Alphasida depressa (Solier, 1836)
- Alphasida detrita (Rey, 1892)
- Alphasida deyrollei Reitter, 1917
- Alphasida discostriata (Escalera, 1922)
- Alphasida dubia (Rambur, 1842)
- Alphasida elongata (Solier, 1836)
- Alphasida escalerai (Oberthur, 1903)
- Alphasida espagnoli Cobos, 1962
- Alphasida exilata (Escalera, 1925)
- Alphasida ferreri Cobos, 1988
- Alphasida frigidissima (Escalera, 1923)
- Alphasida gigas (Dufour, 1820)
- Alphasida goudoti (Solier, 1836)
- Alphasida gracilis (Allard, 1869)
- Alphasida graditana (Rambur, 1842)
- Alphasida granadina (Escalera, 1922)
- Alphasida grandipalpis (Allard, 1869)
- Alphasida granifera (Solier, 1836)
- Alphasida granipunctatipennis (Escalera, 1923)
- Alphasida granosa (Escalera, 1921)
- Alphasida granulifera (Chevrolat, 1840)
- Alphasida gredosana Pérez-Vera & Ávila Sánchez-Jofré, 2016
- Alphasida grossa (Solier, 1836)
- Alphasida hesperica (Rambur, 1842)
- Alphasida heydeni Reitter, 1917
- Alphasida himerera Reitter, 1917
- Alphasida hispalensis (Escalera, 1906)
- Alphasida hispanica (Solier, 1836)
- Alphasida holosericea (Germar, 1824)
- Alphasida ibicensis (Perez, 1868)
- Alphasida indecisa (Escalera, 1923)
- Alphasida inesperata (Escalera, 1921)
- Alphasida ithana Reitter, 1917
- Alphasida jumillensis (Escalera, 1922)
- Alphasida koltzei Reitter, 1917
- Alphasida lacunosa (Escalera, 1923)
- Alphasida laevis (Solier, 1836)
- Alphasida lasellai Ferrer, 1983
- Alphasida lazaroi Escalera, 1906
- Alphasida leonensis Reitter, 1917
- Alphasida levantina Pérez-Vera, Ávila & Martínez, 2017
- Alphasida lopezi (Escalera, 1906)
- Alphasida lorcana (Perez, 1865)
- Alphasida loroi (Escalera, 1922)
- Alphasida lucens (Escalera, 1923)
- Alphasida luctuosa (Boisduval, 1835)
- Alphasida lusitana (Escalera, 1923)
- Alphasida magnifica (Escalera, 1923)
- Alphasida marseuli (Allard, 1868)
- Alphasida martinezi (Escalera, 1901)
- Alphasida martini (Escalera, 1903)
- Alphasida merceti (Bolivar, 1914)
- Alphasida meridionalis (Escalera, 1923)
- Alphasida montana (Rambur, 1842)
- Alphasida moroderi Pérez-Vera, Ávila & Martínez, 2017
- Alphasida multicostata (Escalera, 1923)
- Alphasida multigranulosa (Escalera, 1923)
- Alphasida oberthuri (Escalera, 1901)
- Alphasida olmedensis (Escalera, 1922)
- Alphasida ovalis (Escalera, 1923)
- Alphasida parallela (Solier, 1836)
- Alphasida pilosipennis (Escalera, 1923)
- Alphasida porcata (Solier, 1836)
- Alphasida pozuelensis (Escalera, 1923)
- Alphasida pseudogoudoti (Escalera, 1923)
- Alphasida puncticollis (Solier, 1836)
- Alphasida punctigranosa (Escalera, 1923)
- Alphasida punctipennis (Perez, 1865)
- Alphasida querensis (Escalera, 1923)
- Alphasida rectipennis (Escalera, 1925)
- Alphasida robledana Pérez-Vera & Ávila Sánchez-Jofré, 2016
- Alphasida robusta (Escalera, 1922)
- Alphasida rufomarginalis (Escalera, 1906)
- Alphasida rufopubescens (Escalera, 1905)
- Alphasida ruiderensis (Escalera, 1922)
- Alphasida sagrensis (Escalera, 1922)
- Alphasida salmantina (Escalera, 1923)
- Alphasida sanchezgomezi (Escalera, 1901)
- Alphasida solieri (Rambur, 1842)
- Alphasida squalida (Allard, 1869)
- Alphasida strangulata (Escalera, 1922)
- Alphasida subbaetica Obregón & Verdugo, 2012
- Alphasida sulcata (Allard, 1868)
- Alphasida syriaca (Allard, 1868)
- Alphasida tijolensis (Escalera, 1922)
- Alphasida toletana (Escalera, 1922)
- Alphasida tuberculata (Allard, 1868)
- Alphasida turrillensis (Escalera, 1922)
- Alphasida typica Gebien, 1935
- Alphasida uhagoni (Escalera, 1912)
- Alphasida volxemi (Escalera, 1905)
- Alphasida zapaterii (Pérez Arcas, 1872)
